= List of ice and snow sculpture events =

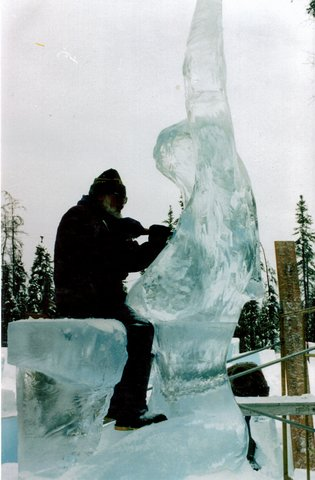
Mexican sculptor Abel Ramírez Águilar working on an entry for an ice sculpture competition

Ice Festival, Ice and Snow Festival, or Snow and Ice Festival may refer to one of the following events.

- Harbin International Ice and Snow Sculpture Festival, China
- Blue Pearl Ice Festival, Mongolia
- Sapporo Snow Festival, Japan
- World Ice Art Championships, Alaska, United States
- Perm International Snow and Ice Sculpture Festival, Russia
- Snowking Winter Festival, Yellowknife, Canada
- Michigan Technological University's Winter Carnival, Houghton, Michigan, United States
- Meltdown Winter Ice Festival, Richmond, Indiana, United States
- Saint Paul Winter Carnival, Saint Paul, Minnesota, United States

== See also ==
- Frost fair
- Winter carnival
- List of winter festivals
