= Fur Rendezvous Festival =

Annual winter festival

Coordinates: 61°13′06″N 149°53′23″W

The Fur Rendezvous Festival (usually called Fur Rendezvous, Fur Rondy, or simply Rondy) is an annual winter festival held in Anchorage, Alaska, in late February. The self-styled "largest winter festival in North America", Fur Rendezvous is highly anticipated by many Anchorage-area residents as marking the beginning of the end of a long winter and the approach of spring. In 2012, Fur Rendezvous was selected as the number one winter carnival in the world by the National Geographic Traveler.

== History and origins ==
The name "Fur Rendezvous" derives from swap meets at which fur trappers would gather to sell their winter harvests. In early Anchorage, these usually took place in mid-February.

In 1935, Anchorage had a population of only about 3,000 and was very isolated, so to bring the community together and lift spirits, resident Vern Johnson organized a three-day sports tournament, called the Winter Sports Carnival, timed to coincide with the rendezvous, which brought increased activity. As the fur trade was then the second-largest industry in Alaska, folding it into the event seemed natural, and it was renamed the Winter Sports Tournament and Fur Rendezvous from 1937, and later just Fur Rendezvous.

It was common for miners and trappers to have beards in the early days, so a "law" was even made that all men had to grow beards for this event or suffer a fine. This was considered to be part of the fun.

Fur Rendezvous was canceled during the war years, but resumed in 1946, when the festival began to draw visitors from Outside, and has been held every year since. Since 1955 the event has been run by the non-profit Greater Anchorage, Inc.

Traditionally Fur Rendezvous lasted ten days, but since 2004 it has extended through early March, in order to lead into the Iditarod Trail Sled Dog Race and draw more visitors.

2021 will see a modified festival, but the Open World Championship Sled Dog Race will be on hiatus until 2022.

== Events ==
The original Winter Sports Carnival included skiing, hockey, basketball, boxing, and a sled dog race for children, as well as a bonfire and torchlight parade. Modern Rondy has well over 100 events; some of the more significant include:

- Rondy Grand Prix – The Oldest Street Race in the U.S.
- Official Fur Rondy Fur Auction – the descendant of the original fur trade rendezvous, present since the earliest days.
- Miners' and Trappers' Charity Ball and Mr. Fur Face beard contest (since 1950) - Beards are grown as long as possible and they are dyed, decorated and shaped for this contest.
- World Championship Sled Dog Race (since 1946, with a women's race since 1953) - This three-day, 75-mile sled dog race brings mushers from across Alaska and the world. However, it is sometimes canceled in recent years due to warm weather, with the most recent cancellation being in 2006.
- World Championship Dog Weight Pull (since 1967) - sled dogs attempt to pull the greatest weight
- Miss Fur Rendezvous pageant (from at least late 1950s through mid 1970s), also called Miss Fur Rondy
- Snow Sculpture Competition
- Fur Rondy Carnival
- Frostbite Footrace – Costumed competitors run through downtown Anchorage
- Rondy Grand Parade
- Running of the Reindeer – a whimsical annual event, started in 2008, that sends "herds" of people running down a four-block downtown street, with a group of reindeer released behind them, charging through the runners in a spoof of Pamplona's Running of the Bulls.
- Rondy on Ice – figure skating show
- World Ice Bowling Championships

Many events tend toward the whimsical, such as the Outhouse Races (in which teams build outhouses and pull them on skis with a rider inside), ice bowling, or even snowshoe softball matches. Others focus on Alaska Native culture, such as the Multi-Tribal Gathering and Charlotte Jensen Native Arts Market.

== Pins ==
Since 1939, promotional pins have been created and sold each year to raise money for the event. These pins have become popular collectibles, and older or rare pins can sell well in excess of $100. The Kiwanis Club of Anchorage nee University Kiwanis Club sells pins and booster buttons dressed as Keystone Cops for the duration of the festival. During the parade the Keystone Cops, or "Rondy Kops," playfully detain attendees in a mobile jail until pins or buttons are purchased in exchange for their release. The 2025 festival pin was inspired by the Anchorage White Raven.
