= Blue Pearl Ice Festival =

Annual ice festival in Khövsgöl , Mongolia

Blue Pearl Ice Festival Хөх Cувд Mөсний Баяр
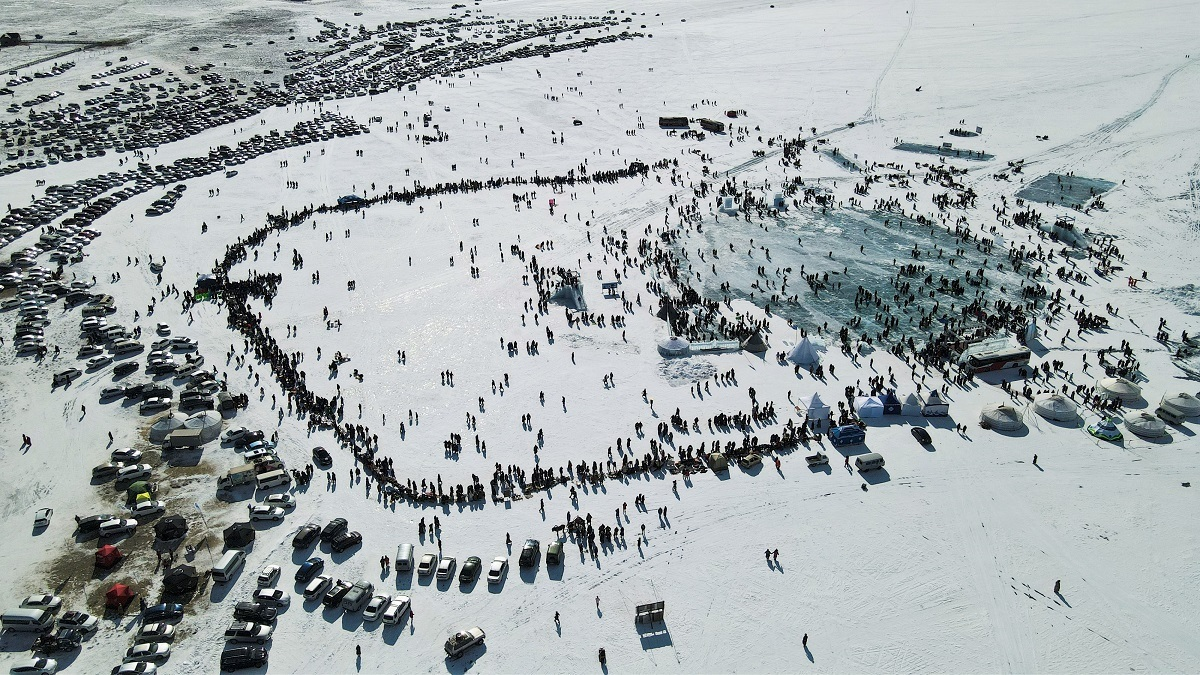
- Begins: 2000
- Location: Khövsgöl
- Country: Mongolia
- Founder: D. Lkhagvatsogt and J. Tumursukh
- Attendance: 20,000 (2024)

The Blue Pearl Ice Festival (Mongolian: Хөх Cувд Mөсний Баяр) is an annual ice festival in Khövsgöl Province, Mongolia.

== History ==
The festival was firstly organized in 2000 by D. Lkhagvatsogt and J. Tumursukh. In 2001, the festival was expanded to be a winter tourism event in Mongolia. The event was cancelled in 2020 and 2021 due to COVID-19 pandemic in Mongolia.

== Activities ==
The festival consists of various activities, such as ice skating race, ice shooting, horse races, etc.

== Visitors ==
In 2024, the festival attracted more than 20,000 visitors, with guests from eight countries, including Japan, South Korea, Germany, and the United States.

== See also ==
- Snow in Mongolia
- List of ice and snow sculpture events
