= Michigan Technological University Winter Carnival =

Annual event in Houghton, Michigan

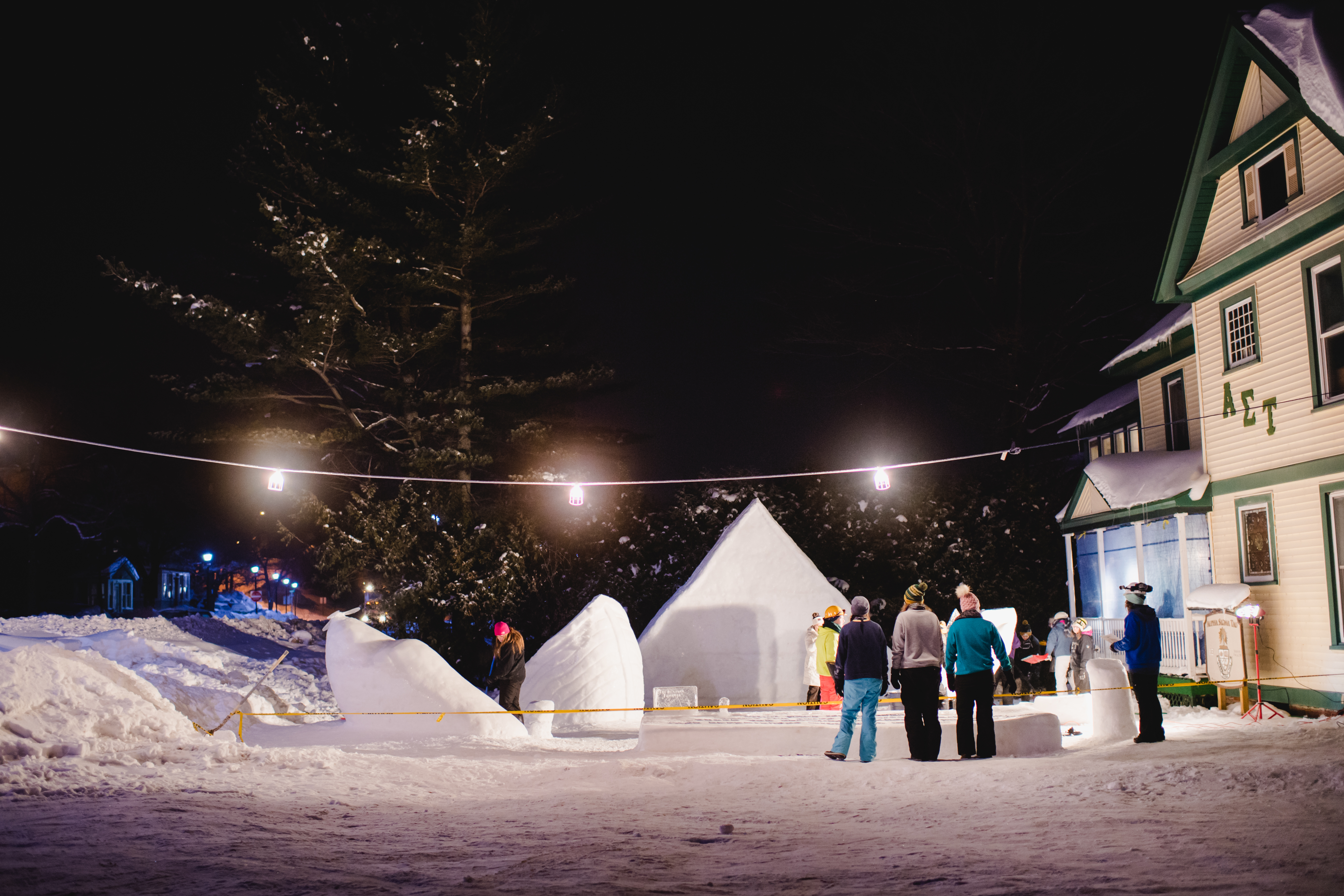
- MTU Winter Carnival 2018
- Status: Active
- Frequency: Annual
- Location: Houghton, Michigan
- Country: United States
- Years active: 103–104
- Inaugurated: 1922
- Website: www.mtu.edu/winter-carnival/

Michigan Technological University's Winter Carnival is a winter celebration held annually in Houghton, Michigan. The event is characterized by snow statues, outdoor games, and student activities. February 2022 marked the 100th anniversary of the carnival.

== History ==
Winter Carnival has been hosted by Michigan Technological University since 1922. There are conflicting stories, but generally, most agree that the first winter carnival was an ice circus at the Amphidrome. Skits with costumers were presented and over the years, various other features were added. There was ski riding in 1927 in which people were towed by a low-flying plane. The first Winter Carnival queen was selected in 1928 with coronation ceremonies marking the occasion. A major feature of Winter Carnival has been a hockey series which was stated in 1928 when the Michigan Tech Huskies swept the University of Michigan.

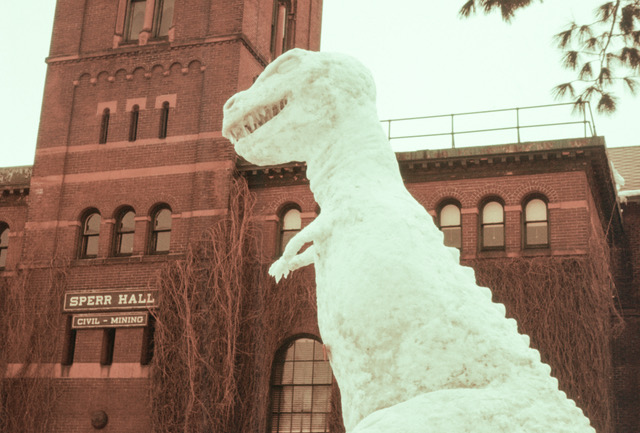
1956 Winter Carnival snow statue Tyrannosaurus Rex built by the student organization Rock Knockers Club

The First snow statues were built in the early 1930s, and by 1935, the building of statues became established as an important feature of the Winter Carnival. In time, a carnival queen and a carnival parade were added. In 1930, Winter Carnival was cancelled due to the Great Crash the previous year. None would be held until 1934, when Michigan Tech's chapter of Blue Key National Honor Fraternity revived Winter Carnival and ran the event. Winter Carnival was cancelled in 1944 due to World War II. In 1946, Winter Carnival returned with the addition of skits and were performed at the Kerredge Theater in Hancock, Michigan. Ice revues and pageantry on Mont Ripley became popular in the 1950s. In time, Winter Carnival became a manifestation of campus life at Michigan Tech - a break in the winter term that was bringing reams of publicity. Photographs, published in metropolitan newspapers, attracted national attention.

=== Themes, logos and Winter Carnival pictorials ===
In 1958, Blue Key began the tradition of selecting a yearly theme for the events, including motion pictures, historical events, comics, music and more. Snow statue designs are inspired by the theme. Eventually, a logo contest was incorporated with cash prizes. In 1964, the Michigan Tech Lode student newspaper began publishing the Winter Carnival Pictorial. The 2022 Winter Carnival theme was "Come one, Come All...", echoing the original 1922 circus theme, to celebrate the 100th anniversary of Michigan Technological University Winter Carnival.

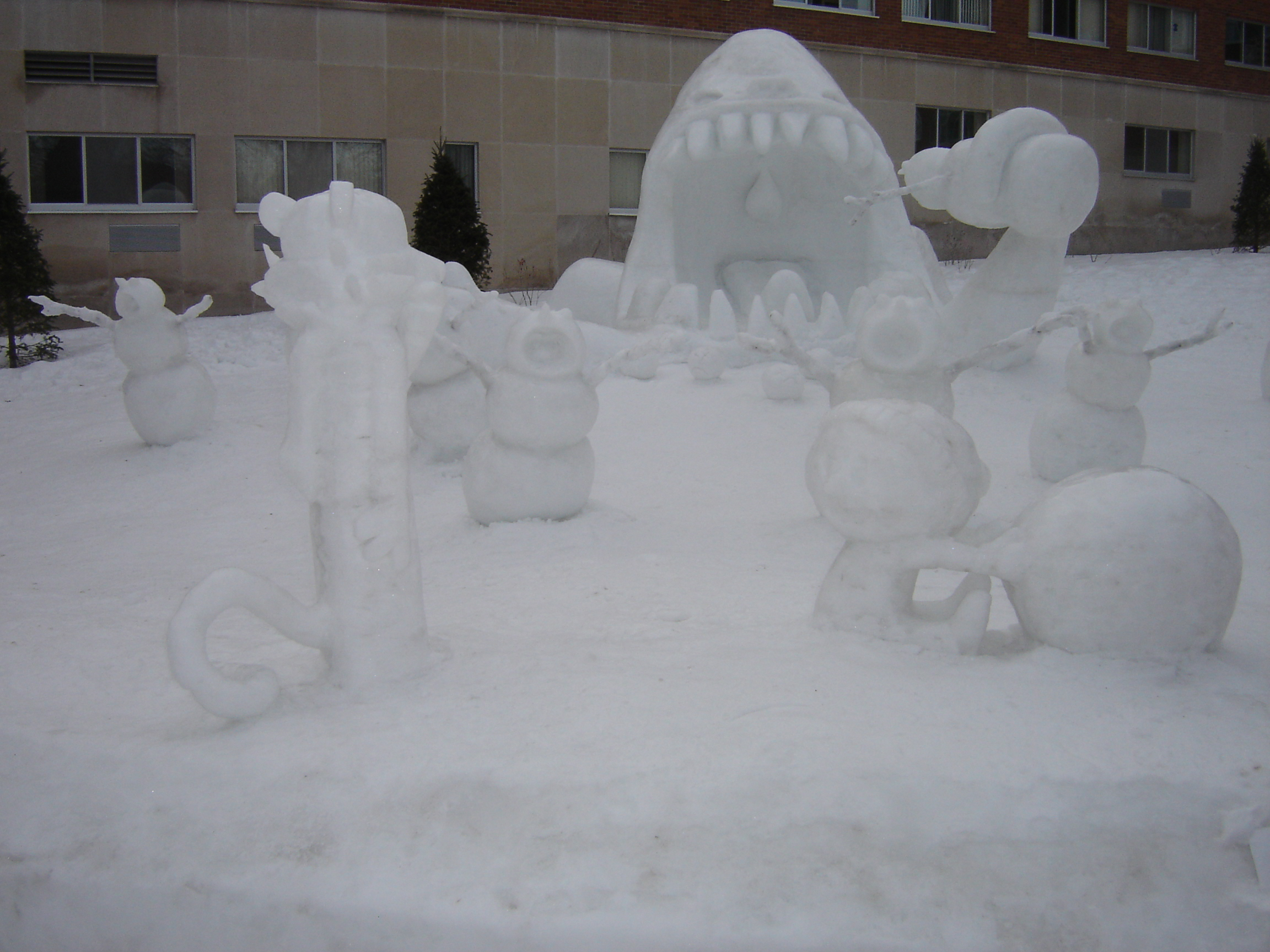
Statue inspired by Calvin & Hobbes, 2006 (one nighter)

=== Demographics ===
Winter Carnival brought the mostly male student population of the predominantly engineering college of Michigan Tech visits from girlfriends downstate. In 1963, the ratio of men to women students at Michigan Tech was 25:1. The Winter Carnival Pictorial noted in 1964 that the coed population was increasing each year, but remained predominantly a men's school. To accommodate this fact, the Student Council sponsored chartered busses from Detroit, Chicago, and New York. For a few short days "the books and slide rules are forgotten - stag parties are set aside - and Tech looks almost like many imagine a liberal arts school might.". The bus service has since been discontinued.

As of the fall semester in 2021, the total enrollment at Michigan Technological University was 6,977. Of those students, 2,054 were women (an all-time high), which means female students made up about 29% of the enrollment at Michigan Tech.

=== Notable Winter Carnival entertainment ===
In 1979, the Canadian band The Guess Who performed two concerts during Winter Carnival.

=== Past traditions ===
In 1947, a beard-growing competition was started, where Michigan Tech students were judged by the Winter Carnival queen for the best beard.

In 1948, a series of ice shows began, featuring local talent and amateur stars from all over the world. Olympic skating contenders were often invited to perform.

In 1966, Michigan Tech students mailed snowballs to Southwest Texas State University (now Texas State University) so students in the Lone Star State could have a campus-wide snowball fight.

On February 7, 1981, the 1st Annual Blizzard Baja was hosted by Michigan Tech's Society of Automotive Engineers student chapter. The objective was to start a competition allowing student chapters who had competed in previous Baja SAE competitions to test their vehicle's design concepts and performance in a different climate and terrain. The competition is still held annually at Michigan Tech, but not during Winter Carnival.

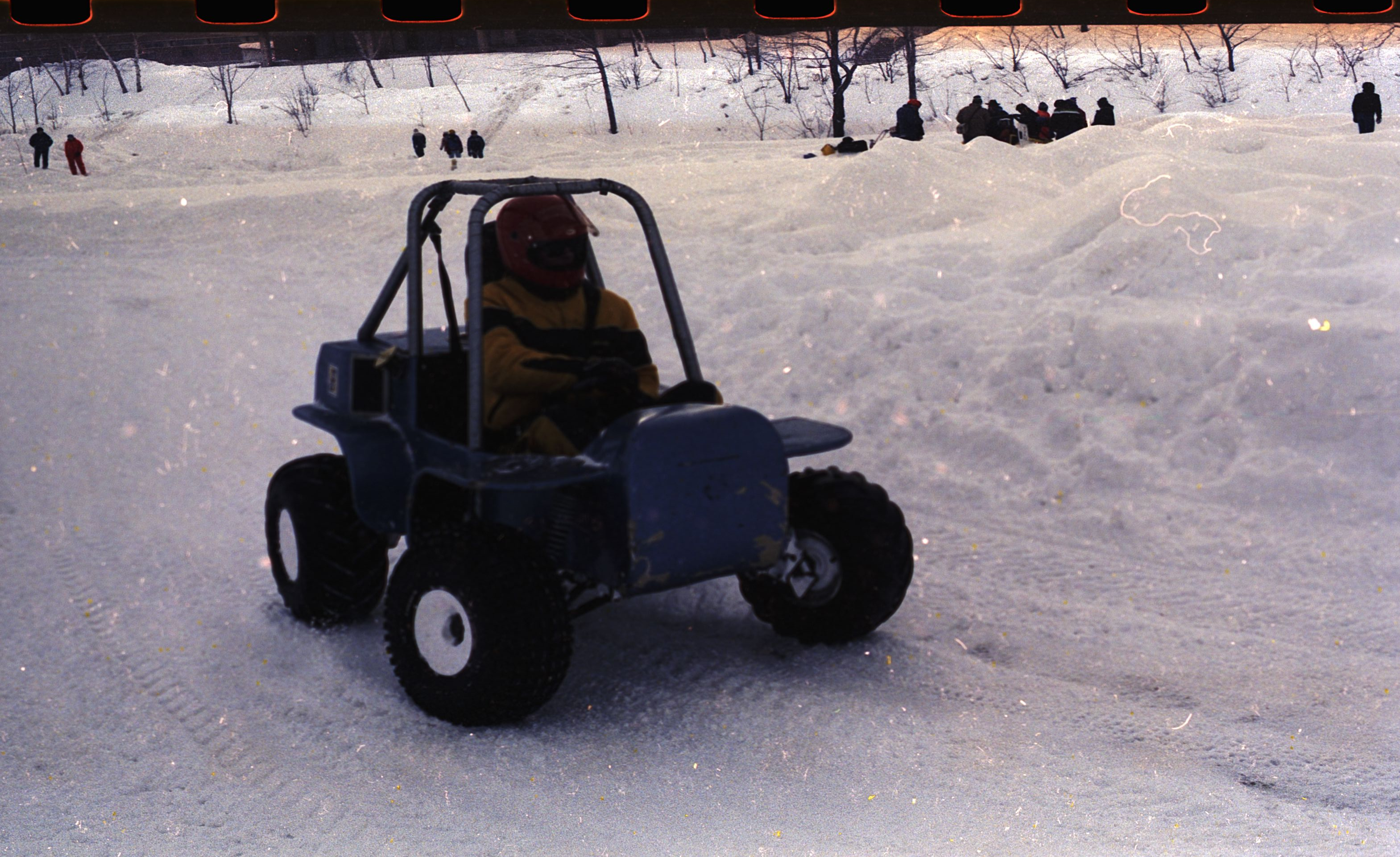
1981 Winter Carnival Blizzard Baja

== Snow sculptures ==
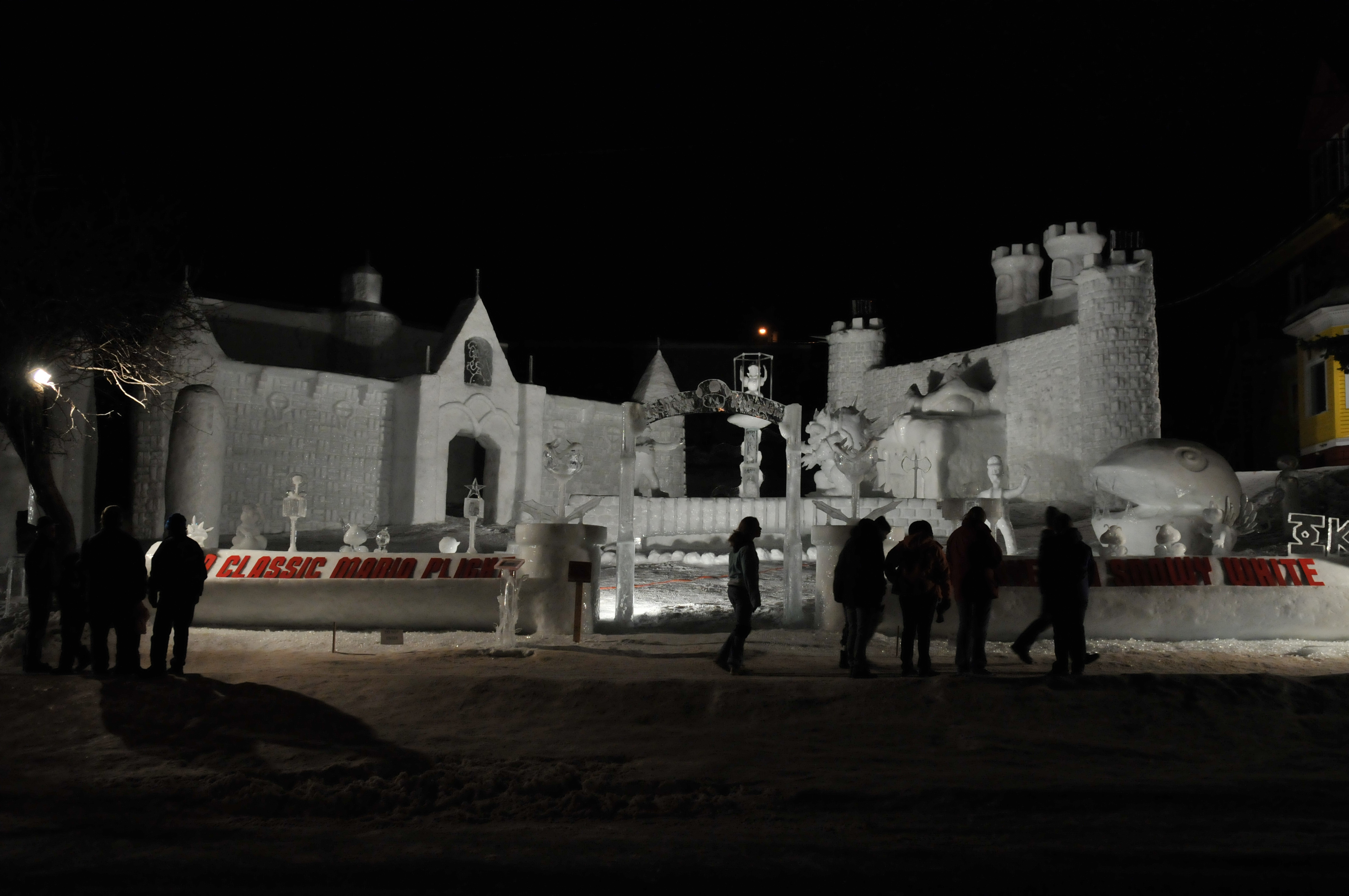
Month-long statue from 2010 with a Mario theme

The largest tourist attractions of Winter Carnival are the monumental snow sculptures. Every year Blue Key National Honor Society chooses an overall theme, and student organizations compete to build the best snow statue based on the theme. Organizations compete in either month-long or all-nighter divisions, split between men, women, and coed. Month-long statues have a month to build, resulting in large, detailed sculptures. Most statues in the month-long competition are built by fraternities and sororities, with some residence halls and student organizations competing as well. All-nighter statues are built during the first night of Winter Carnival, or the "all-nighter". Participating students begin construction at 4:00 p.m. and must be done by 8:00 a.m. the next morning. Statues must be pristine white and structurally sound. They must also be self-supporting, with no external scaffolding or hidden beams inside.

== Winter Carnival queen coronation ==
One of Michigan Tech Winter Carnival's oldest traditions is the crowning of a Winter Carnival queen. Coronations began in 1928 and have had several candidates apply throughout the decades. The competition begins with 30 nominated candidates in early December and results in final eight competitors by Winter Carnival. Each candidate competes in an interview, talent competition, academics, and her involvement around campus. After voting by the student body and evaluations by a judging committee, the queen is crowned. The queen receives a crown and a bouquet during coronation. The queen make appearances at Michigan Tech hockey games and around the campus. She also awards the MVP of the hockey games, rides the zamboni, judges snow sculptures, and rides in parades in Houghton and Hancock.

== Greek involvement ==
Michigan Technological University's Greek community plays a large role in the festivities. Greeks also participate in Winter Carnival activities to gain points to be the overall winner of Winter Carnival. These activities include the statue competition, the Queen's competition, Stage Revue, Beards competition, and additional winter competitions. Being named the winner of Winter Carnival gives the organization bragging rights until the next Winter Carnival.

== Blue Key National Honor Society ==
- Michigan Tech's Blue Key chapter organizes the Winter Carnival festivities on campus. Blue Key's Winter Carnival Committee is divided into six categories: Special Events, Stage Revue, Statues, Publicity, and Royalty. This group plans and oversees Winter Carnival.
  - Special Events group is in charge of events including snow volleyball, broomball, cross-country skiing, curling, downhill skiing, human dogsled race, ice bowling, ice skating, snowboarding, and tug-of-war. This group is responsible for all aspects of the events, from getting the equipment to scheduling the time and place.
  - The Stage Revue Group oversees the entirety of organizing the stage revue competition, planning, sale of tickets, finding and management of stage show MC and judges.
  - The Statues Group tracks scaffolding and other sculpture tools. They oversee the building of the statues and provide mandatory safety sessions for all participants beforehand.
  - The Royalty committee is in charge of the entire royalty event. This includes organizing the applicants, conducting interviewing and judging for the royalty competition.
  - Public Relations coordinates Blue Key's contact with the community. The committee deals with the raffle, the entire donor registry, and social media.
- Michigan Technological University's Blue Key Chapter chooses the Winter Carnival theme. Recent themes included: A Frigid Place Gets a Blast from Space (2009), Games We Know Captured in Snow (2010), Thousands of Pages Unfold in the Bitter Cold (2011), and From All Over the State, What Makes Michigan Great (2012).

== Special events ==
- Two series hockey game with a CCHA opponent
- Broomball, a popular game throughout the winter at Michigan Tech, is even more popular during Winter Carnival. Games are scheduled over the four-day span of Winter Carnival.
- All-Nighter is a campus-wide event and includes a variety of activities including the statue building. Prior to all-nighter, a set of speakers are put into a stereo made of snow. Music is played for all of the campus to enjoy until about 3:00 AM. There is also an all-you-can-eat pancake breakfast served until 7:00 AM.
- The Stage Revue is a competition of skits that began in 1946. Greek organizations are the most common participants but other campus organizations also participate by acting out short skits. The skits are written and produced by the students and often humorously target University faculty members, politicians and world situations. The individual skits are judged for 1st, 2nd, and 3rd place.

== See also ==
- List of ice and snow sculpture events
- Winter carnival
- Ice sculpture
- Snow sculpture
