= La statue de la Résistance =

1870 snow sculpture by Alexandre Falguière

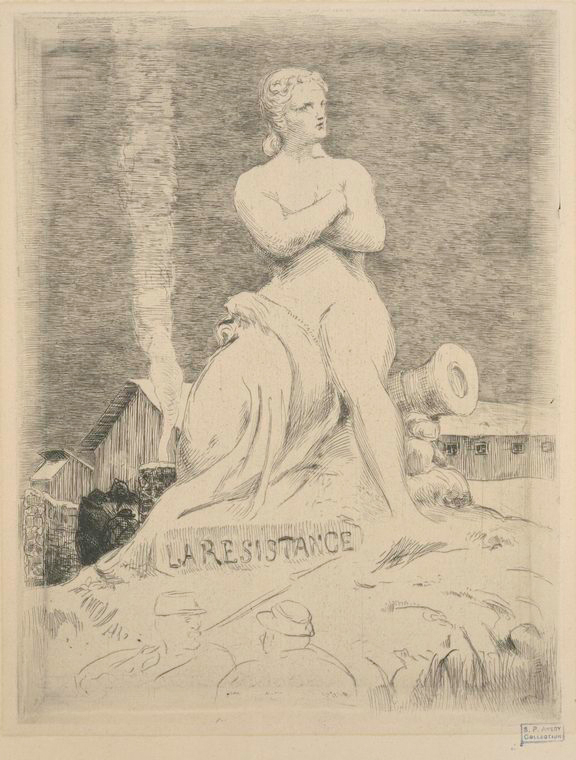
Bracquemond's etching of Falguière's sculpture

La statue de la Résistance par Falguière (The statue of the Resistance by Falguière) was a 9-foot tall snow sculpture of a nude woman with a cannon made on 8 December 1870 by Alexandre Falguière during the Siege of Paris in the Franco-Prussian War. Falguière was a member of a National Guard company comprising many artists and intellectuals, among them Félix Philippoteaux. Falguière, assisted by his comrades, erected the statue in a few hours, to symbolize French resistance to Prussia. Philippoteaux's sketch of the sculpture was published later that month. It became a tourist attraction, along with a less celebrated snow bust by Hippolyte Moulin near by. Theodore de Banville wrote an ode and Félix Bracquemond made an etching published by Faustin Betbeder. After the snow sculpture had melted, Falguière's attempts to recreate it in a more permanent medium were unsuccessful, lacking the original's spontaneity. It was Falguière's first female nude, a subject in which he later specialised.
