= Snow fort =

Structure made of snow

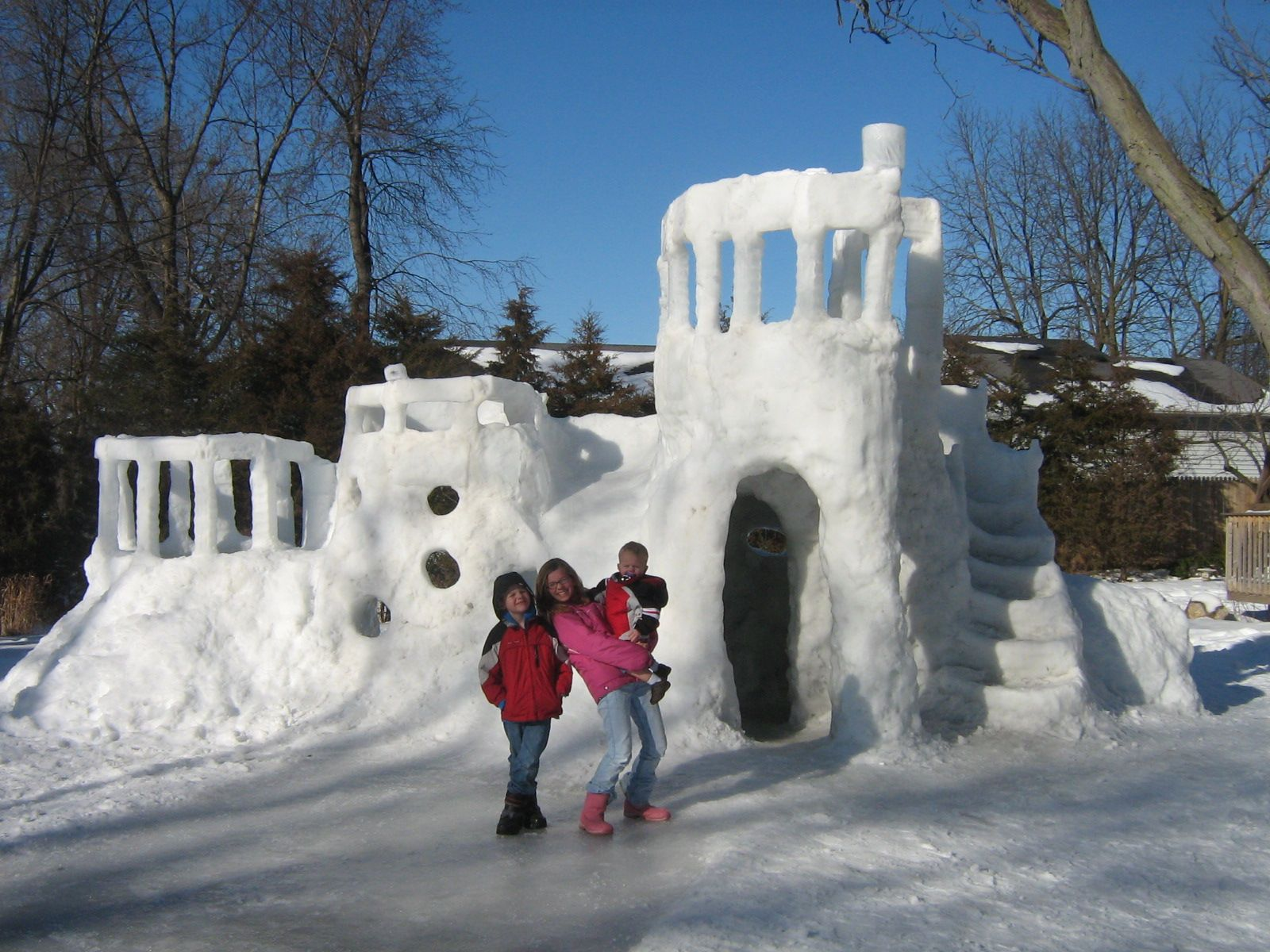
A large snow fort in Grand Rapids, Michigan

A snow fort or snow castle is a usually open-topped temporary structure made of snow walls that is usually used for recreational purposes. Snow forts are generally built by children as a playground game or winter pastime and are used as defensive structures in snowball fights. They are also built and used for make-believe games such as "house", "store", or "community", a game where multiple forts are built in a group. Along with the snowman, it is one of the two structures commonly built by children out of snow.

Snow structures made for sleeping are called igloos when made from snow blocks and quinzhees when made by hollowing out a pile of snow.

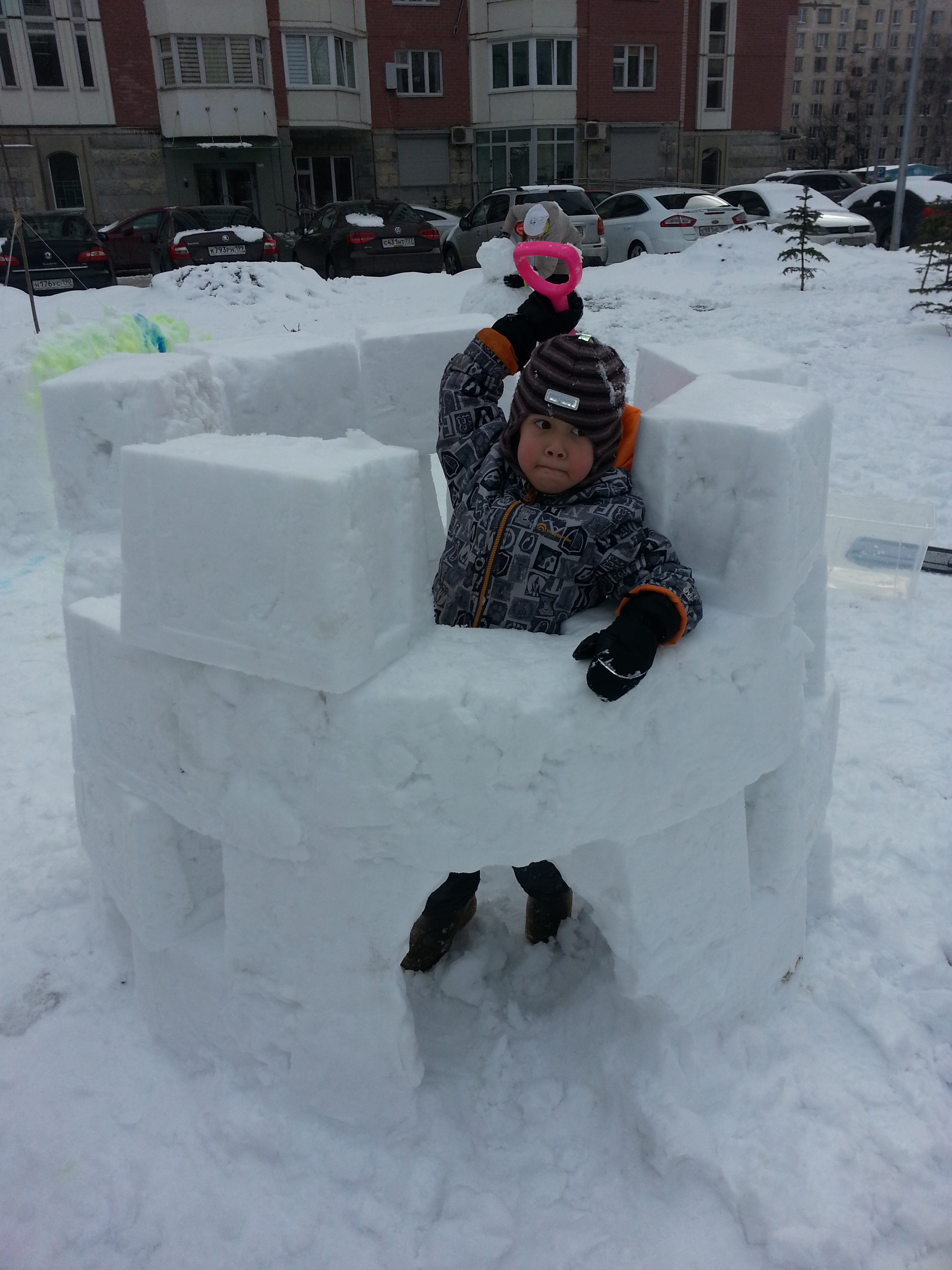
Little snow fort built with a plastic tub (Moscow, Russia)

== Variations ==
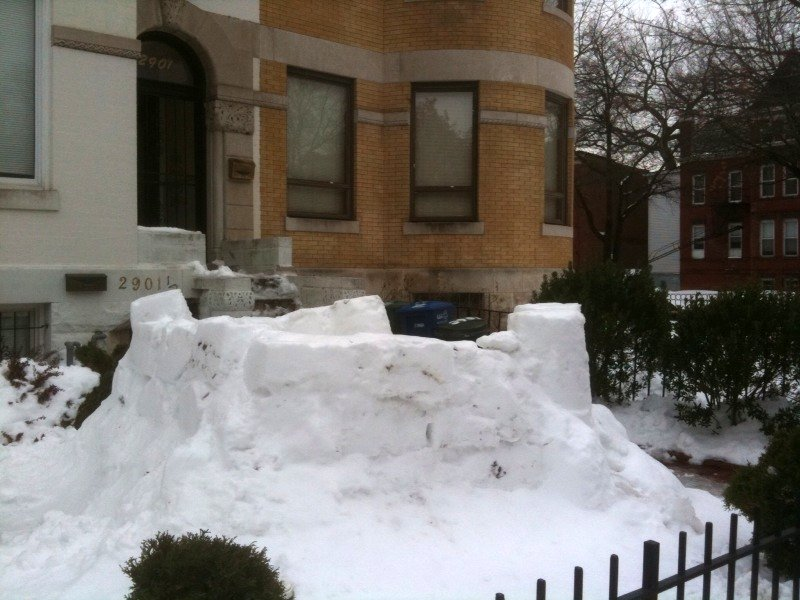
A snow fort in Washington, D.C., United States

A snow fort consists of walls of piled and compacted snow. They may be "open" or "closed", that is, a person in the snow fort may be completely surrounded by the walls on all sides, there may be a "door", or the person may be completely exposed on one side. The latter variation is used for snowball fights, in which opponents have forts facing each other and attack exclusively from their own fort. Existing structures such as the walls or concave corners of a building can be used as part of the snow fort, allowing for faster and easier construction. A snow fort can also be a tunneled-out burrow built in a large snowdrift.

Although the most common way to pack snow for a fort is by piling, pressing, and/or carving out snow by hand, possibly with the aid of a snow shovel, other ways exist. One way is to roll out large balls of snow as if making a snowman, line them up in a protective barrier, and use loose snow as mortar to hold them together. Another way is to create cylindrical snow blocks by shovelling snow into a five-gallon bucket and then compacting it. If made out of wet snow and left to freeze overnight, these blocks become almost indestructible. They can be difficult to stack into a stable defensive structure, but they can double as unwieldy yet powerful missiles capable of punching holes in enemy snow forts, knocking over a grown man, etc.

Snow forts are usually at least knee-height and one-roomed. Forts built for snowball fights may be higher, and ones built for "house" may have lower walls and multiple rooms. When used for snowball fights, snow forts often have sections where the wall is lower, through which the occupants throw snowballs.

=== Finland ===
The SnowCastle of Kemi is claimed to be the biggest snow castle in the world, first built in Kemi in 1996. Since then the world's largest snow castle has been rebuilt annually. The area has varied from 13,000 to over 20,000 square meters. Its highest towers have been over 20 meters high and its longest walls over 1,000 meters long. Sometimes there have been three-story buildings there. The SnowRestaurant has ice tables and seats covered with reindeer fur. The ecumenical SnowChapel, decorated with ice sculptures, has seen numerous weddings, with some couples coming from Japan and Hong Kong. There is also a SnowHotel in the snow castle. The hotel has double rooms and a honeymoon suite with ice decorations.

There are also ice decorations in Lainio Snow Hotel (near Ylläs and Levi, Finland).

=== Canada ===
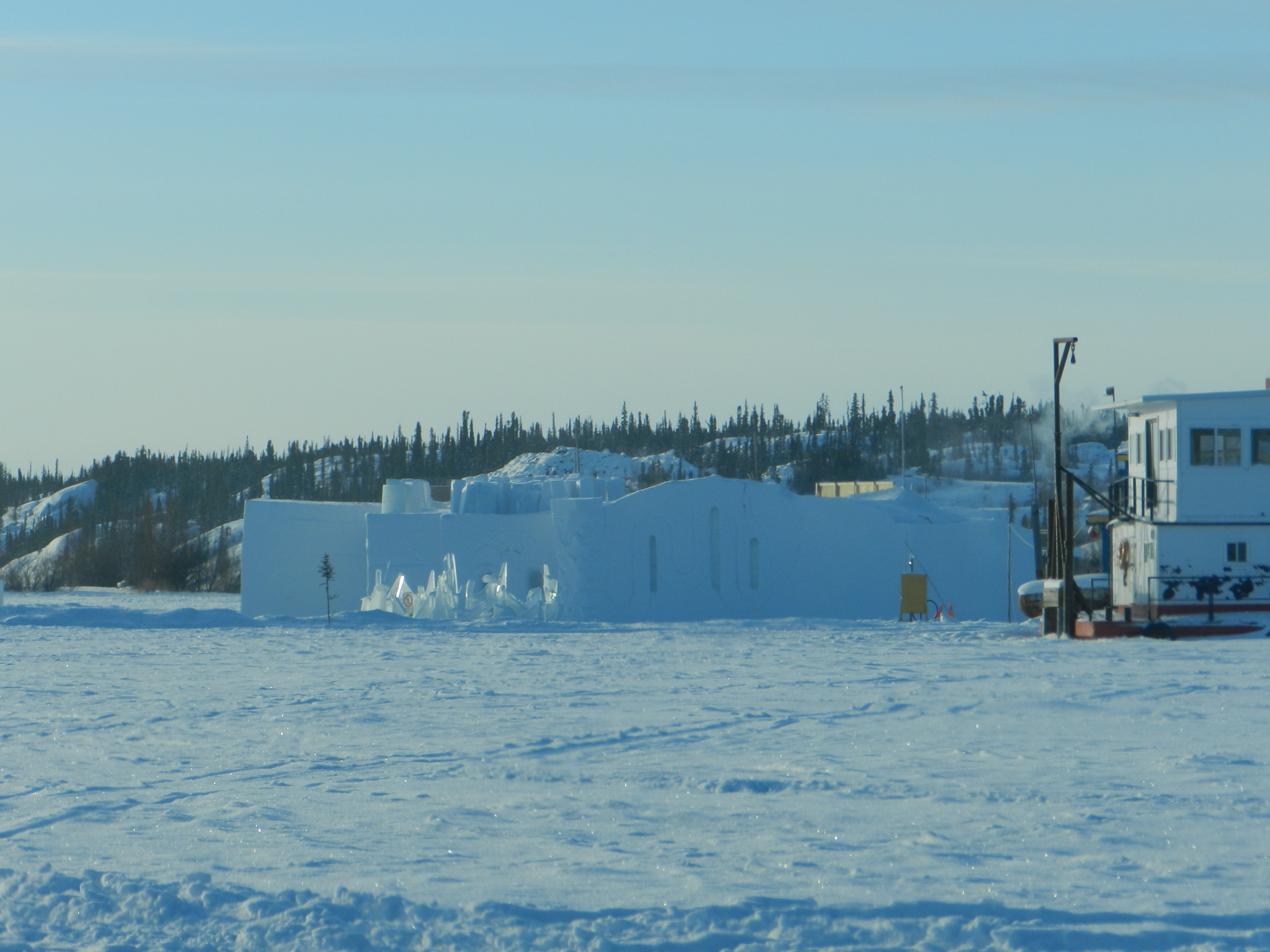
The Snowking Winter Festival castle under construction

In Kingston, Ontario, the annual FebFest snow sculpture competition in Confederation Park features snow forts by the Royal Military College of Canada and Queen's University. The snow forts must not only be pleasing to look at but also safe for children to play on. In 2008, the RMC's snow fort was modelled after Ottawa's Mackenzie Building, featuring a central tower with working clock, flanked by projecting end towers and a slide. Both teams worked through the night, filling rectangular recycling bins with snow.

The Snowking Winter Festival is an annual festival held each March in Yellowknife, Northwest Territories. The festival is a major winter tourist draw to Yellowknife. It features a huge snow castle with window panes of ice built on Yellowknife Bay, on Great Slave Lake. The castle is designed and the construction is supervised by Snowking, Anthony Foliot. The design evolves every year and the castle has grown to include an auditorium, cafe, courtyard, traditional igloo, slide, parapets and turrets. Once the castle is completed, it becomes the center of winter arts activity in Yellowknife. This month-long festival includes concerts, art shows, children's theatre, and fireworks shows. Carvers augment the castle with snow and ice sculptures.

== Deaths and injuries ==
Deaths and injuries have occurred relating to the collapse of a snow fort.

- A 12-year-old girl died in 2019 while building a snow fort in Chicago.
- A 10-year-old boy died in 2016 when a snow fort collapsed on him.
- In 2017, 3 people were trapped by a collapsed snow fort and were saved by a dog.

== In popular culture ==
The Backyardigans episode "The Snow Fort" has the Royal Canadian Mounted Police defending an elaborate version of such a fort while members of the ski patrol try to get in.

The Dog Who Stopped the War (1984) is a cult movie and box-office hit in Quebec. Half of this movie revolves around a very elaborate snow fort.

The painting (1891) by Vasily Surikov The Capture of Snow Town (″Взятие снежного городка″)
