= Théophile Barrau =

French sculptor

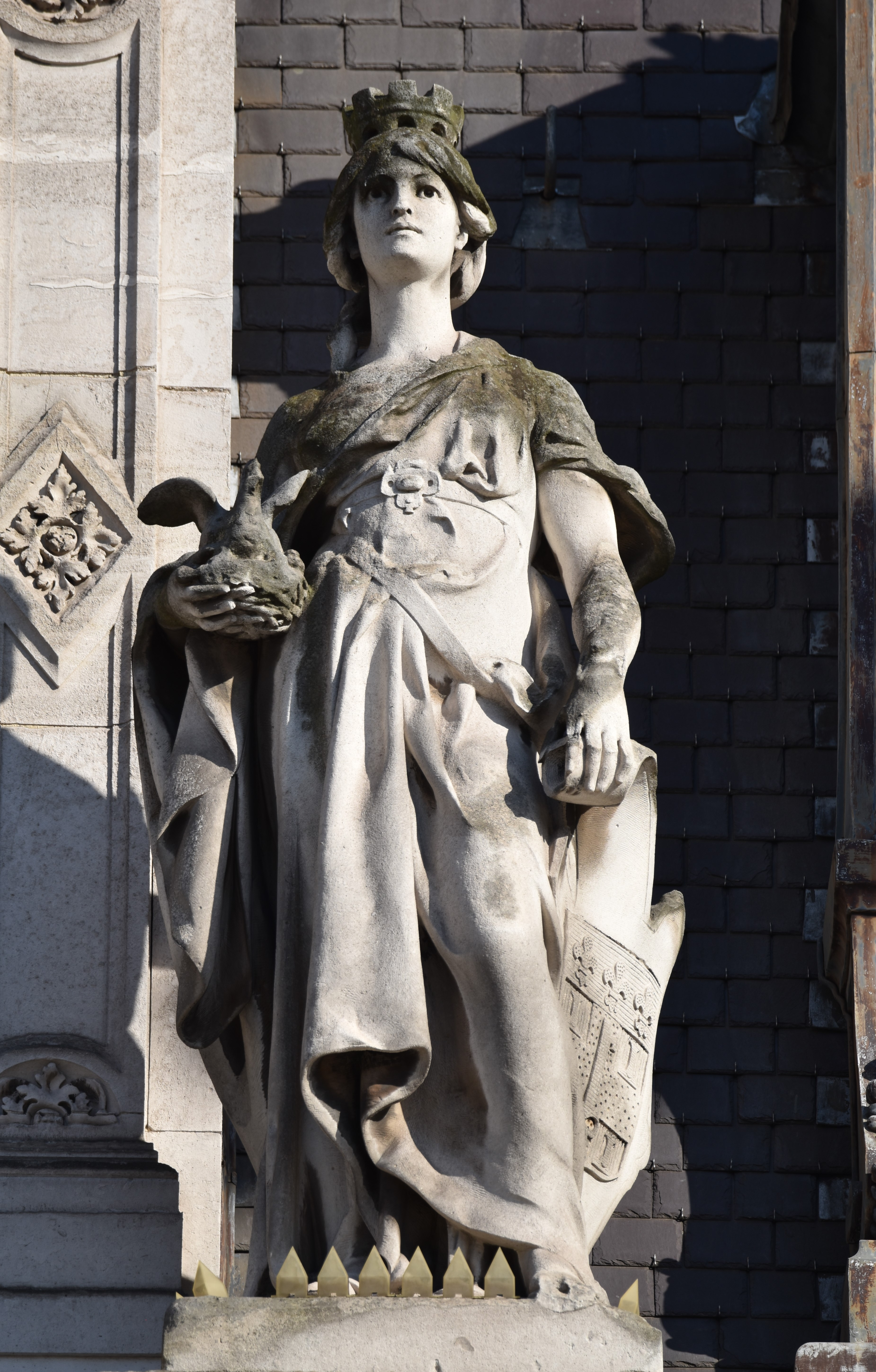
Allegorical figure of the town of Le Mans (1880), Paris, Hôtel de Ville de Paris, main facade

Théophile Barrau (1848–1913) was a French sculptor.

Barrau was born in Carcassonne. He was a student of Alexandre Falguière and started at the Salon in 1874. He received awards in 1879, 1880, 1889, and became a Chevalier of the Legion of Honor in 1892. He died in Paris.

== Main works ==
- Suzanne, 1895, marble, Musée d'Orsay, Paris.
- Monument aux Morts, 1870, architect : Paul Pujol, Toulouse
- Hommage à Pierre Fermat, marble, Salle des Illustres, Capitole of Toulouse
