= Ice bowling =

Sports event

Ice bowling is a variant of traditional ten-pin bowling in that it is played on ice, usually outdoors.

== History ==
Once considered a winter novelty associated with winter festivals throughout the northern United States and Canada, ice bowling is slowly growing into a more established sport in areas with hibernal climates. For instance, in February 2009, the World Ice Bowling Championships took place in Anchorage, Alaska as part of the Anchorage Fur Rendezvous. Such events attest to the rising significance of the fledgling sport.

== Game Play ==
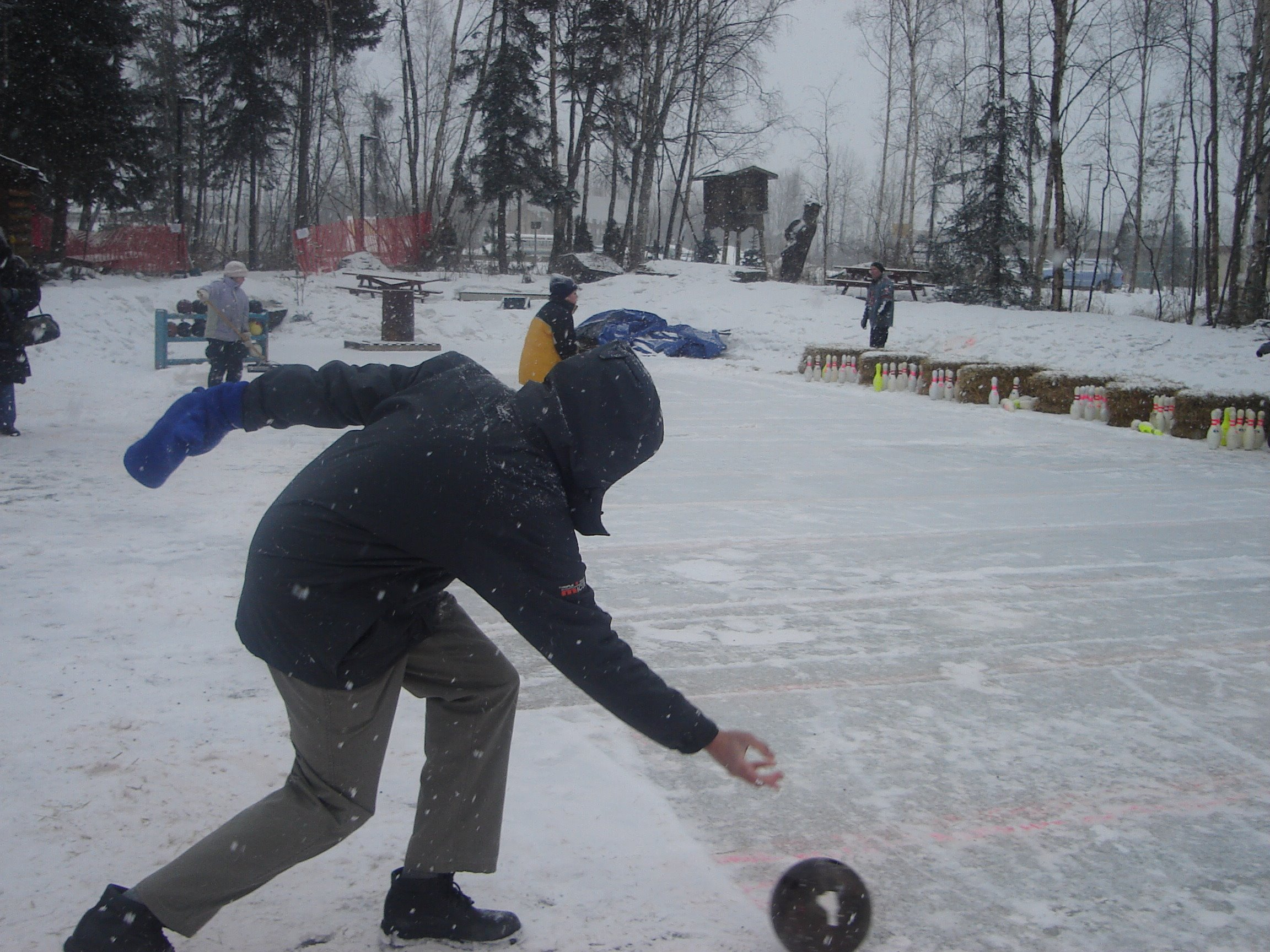
Ice bowling during the Anchorage Fur Rondy.

Ice bowling is strictly an amateur sport and no professional sport association exists for the game yet. Ice bowling lanes are often cleared from natural bodies of ice such as lakes, rivers, or streams, or are created from a field of compacted snow by drizzling with water and allowing the field to freeze solid in due course, a process similar to creating an improvised ice skating rink. Scoring, game format, and general rules and regulations parallel 10 pin bowling quite closely. However, similar to bumper bowling, hay or straw bails are often used in place of gutters, allowing the bowling ball to ricochet its way down the bowling lane. Another notable divergence from modern 10 pin bowling is the lack of automatic ball return mechanisms, necessitating a human lane attendant at the end of the ice lane in order to reset the bowling pins after the bowling ball is put into play, and additionally to return the ball to the hurler. A lane attendant is also responsible for grooming the ice between games in order to ensure a uniform surface free of shavings or impediments. Since the game is often played in inhospitable conditions, with snow, sleet, and hail not unheard of during day-to-day game play, several layers of winter outerwear, including parkas, gloves, scarves, ushanka, and mukluks would be common for players to attire themselves in while engaging in the sport.
