= Mr. Fur Face =

Annual beard contest

Fur Rondy has been held in Anchorage, Alaska during the late winter since 1950. It is a celebration of the time when trappers would return to the city to gather and share stories, sell their furs and antlers, and to socialize. It also commemorates the start of the Iditarod. One part of Fur Rondy is the Miners and Trappers Ball, which is a fundraiser for the Lions Club's of Alaska. The Miners and Trappers Ball has a yearly theme focused on one part of Alaskan life. The highlight of the Miners and Trappers Ball is the Mr. Fur Face beard contest. The contest is sponsored by the South central Alaska Beard and Mustache Club.

== Contest ==
The Mr. Fur Face Contest continues today as one of the longest running beard contests in America. Contestants vie for the title in categories such as:

- Mr. Alaskan Whaler - Beard without a mustache
- Mr. Brown Bear - Brown beard
- Mr. Black Bear - Black beard
- Mr. Honey Bear - Blond beard
- Mr. Mountain Goat - Goatee
- Mr. Polar Bear - White beard
- Mr. Pole Cat - Mixed color beard
- Mr. Ptarmigan - Anything goes
- Mr. Pyrite - Fake beard or mustache
- Mr. Red Fox - Red beard
- Mr. Soup Strainer - Mustache
- Mr. Wolf - Trim, suave beard

The categories are based primarily on facial hair color, but include categories for beard style as well. Three judges choose the winner, but ladies from the audience, affectionately known as the "beard fondlers", are eager to assist in choosing the champion. Each category has a winner and the overall title of Mr. Fur Face is given to the grand champion chosen from the best in each group.

== Past champions ==
If a contestant wins the Overall Title as Mr. Fur Face for three out of five years, then he is able to retire the main trophy and, in doing so, often retires from competing himself. Multiple year winners gain a folklorish type following among many Alaskans. The legendary champions of the contest include David Traver (4X), Robert Crawford (4X), Jim Fisher (4X), John Pex (3X), Earl Carson (3X), Larry Smith (3X), and Warren Kolb (3X).

The newly crowned Mr. Fur Face also becomes the next president of the South Central Alaska Beard and Moustache Club, if he accepts the nomination. If he chooses not to take over the reins of the club, then SCAKBMC members vote for a new president as directed by the club bylaws.

SCAKBMC club members have competed in the World Beard and Moustache Championships in Carson City, Nevada (2003), Berlin, Germany (2005), Brighton, England (2007), Anchorage (2009), and Trondheim, Norway in 2011.

== Sponsors ==
The Miners and Trappers Ball and the Mr. Fur Face contest are put on by volunteers from local Lions Clubs, the SCAKBMC, and other interested parties. All net proceeds from the event go to the charities of the Lions Clubs.
