= Perm International Snow and Ice Sculpture Festival =

The International Snow and Ice Sculpture Festival "Ice, Snow, and Fire" (sometimes translated as "Ice, Snow and Flame") has been held annually in Perm, Russia, in Gorky Amusement Park since 1995.

The festivals holds two competitions: in ice sculpture and snow sculpture.

== See also ==
- Winter festival
