= Julien Caussé =

French sculptor

- Born: Jules Caussé; 27 January 1869; Bourges, France
- Died: 5 March 1938 (aged 69); Bry-sur-Marne, France
- Known for: Sculpture
- Movement: Art Nouveau

Julien Caussé (birth name Jules Caussé) was a prolific French sculptor during the Art Nouveau period of the late 19th and early 20th centuries who specialized in small figures.

== Background and career ==
Jules Caussé was born in Bourges, France on 27 January 1869. He was the son of the sculptor Auguste Caussé and was active as sculptor from 1890 until his death. He studied under Alexandre Falguière and his pieces were exhibited at the Salon des Artistes Français from 1888 to 1913, obtaining honorable mentions in 1882 and 1900 and a third class medal in 1893. He also took part in the Exposition Universelle of 1900.

In his career he produced hundreds of works of art in the Art Nouveau style. His work included solid bronze sculptures and mixed media pieces that included bronze sculptures with glass, wire and stone enhancements. His mixed media work also included sculptures that were designed for more practical purposes, such as lamps and clocks. While the subjects of his works were mainly women, both nude and dressed, he is also known to have produced a limited number of pieces based on male subjects. He is listed in Benezit Dictionary of Artists and his sculpture "La Musique" is featured in volume four of the Berman Book of Bronzes.

Caussé was still active in 1929 and died at the retirement home Fondation Favier in Bry-sur-Marne (eastern suburbs of Paris) on 5 March 1938.

== Selected works ==
- La Fée des Glaces
- Nymphéa
- Brise de Mai
- Tischlampe Muse
- Stehendes Mädchen mit Flöte
- Fin de Journée
