= Hippolyte Moulin =

French sculptor

Hippolyte Alexandre Julien Moulin, sometimes given as Julien-Hippolyte Moulin or Hypolite Moulin, (1832–1884) was a 19th-century French sculptor.

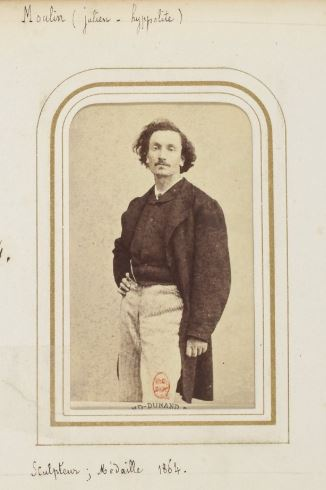
Hyppolite Moulin, 1864

Moulin, a shopkeeper's son, entered the École des Beaux-Arts in 1855 but was unable to afford to continue the lessons and had to become a language teacher in Paris to support himself. He subsequently studied with Auguste-Louis-Marie Ottin and with Antoine-Louis Barye.

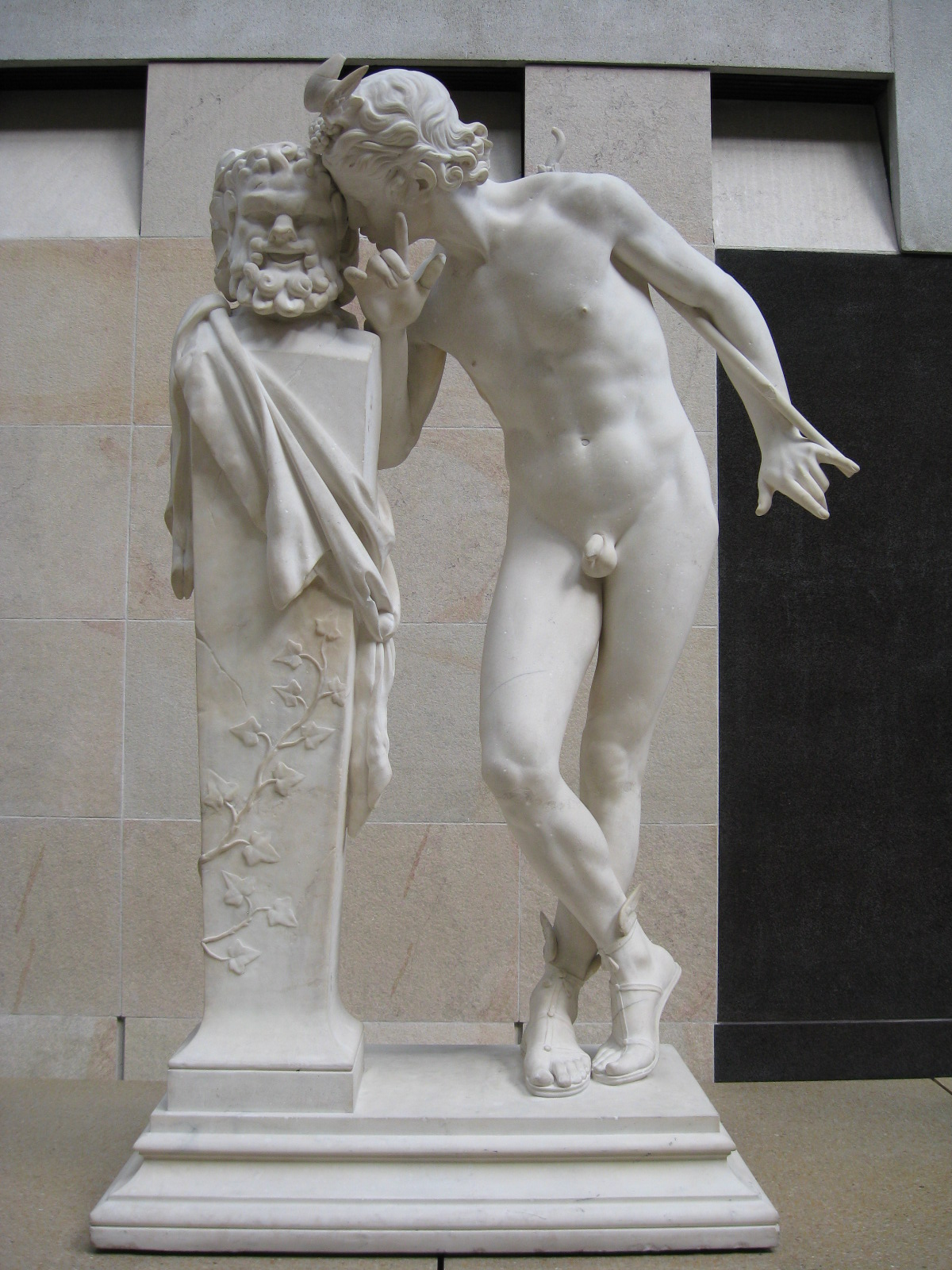
Un secret d'en Haut ("A Secret from on High"), 1875 (Musée d'Orsay)

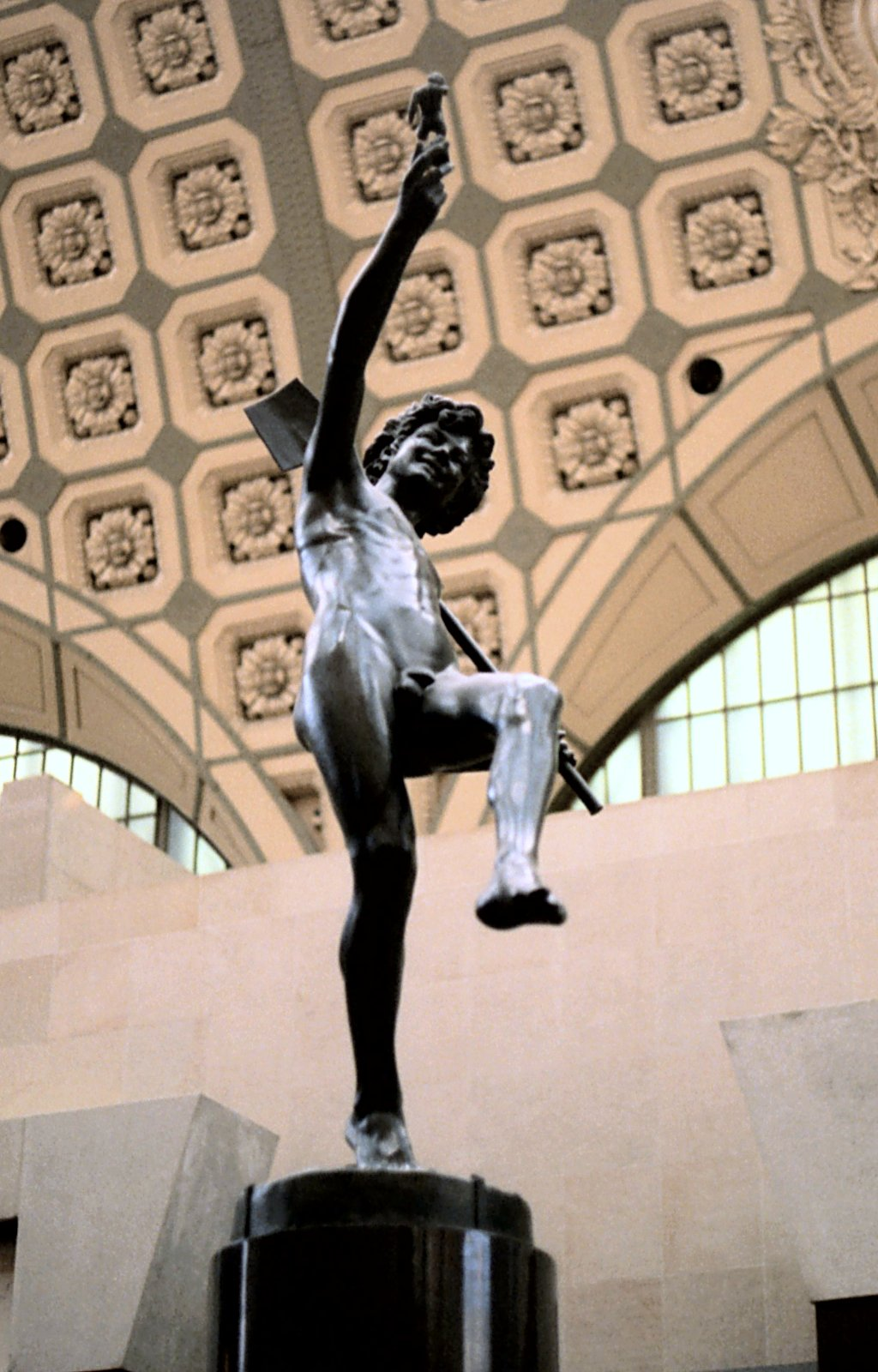
Moulin's Trouvaille à Pompei ("A Lucky Find at Pompeii"), 1863 (Musée d'Orsay)

His bronze statue A Lucky Find at Pompeii (Une Trouvaille à Pompei) (1863) depicts a nude boy with a spade dancing for joy with one leg raised, because he has unearthed a Roman statuette. His nude pose reflects that of the statuette itself, possibly indicating that the statue depicts the excavator imagining himself in the original statuette's pose. The statue won a medal at the Paris Salon of 1864 and became his most famous work. The life-size original was bought by the French Government for 7,000 francs and exhibited at the Exposition Universelle in 1867. It now stands on a tall pedestal in the Musée d'Orsay alongside Alexandre Falguière's Winner of the Cockfight on an adjacent pedestal - another bronze nude dancing boy poised on one leg that had also been exhibited at the 1864 Salon.

Moulin won further Salon medals in 1867 and 1869, and another at the Exposition Universelle, 1878.

His other works include Victoria Mars (plaster exhibited at the Salon of 1872) and A Secret from On High (Secret d'en Haut) (plaster 1873; marble 1875, now also in the Musée d'Orsay alongside other marble statues.)

A Secret from On High depicts a life-size adolescent nude Mercury (Hermes) whispering a secret to a herm - a pillar topped by a bust of himself - knowing that it will never repeat what he tells it.

Moulin spent his last few years in a rest home for the mentally ill.
