= Saint Paul Winter Carnival =

Annual festival in Minnesota, United States

Coordinates: 44°56′40″N 93°5′50″W

The Saint Paul Winter Carnival is an annual festival in Saint Paul, Minnesota, United States.

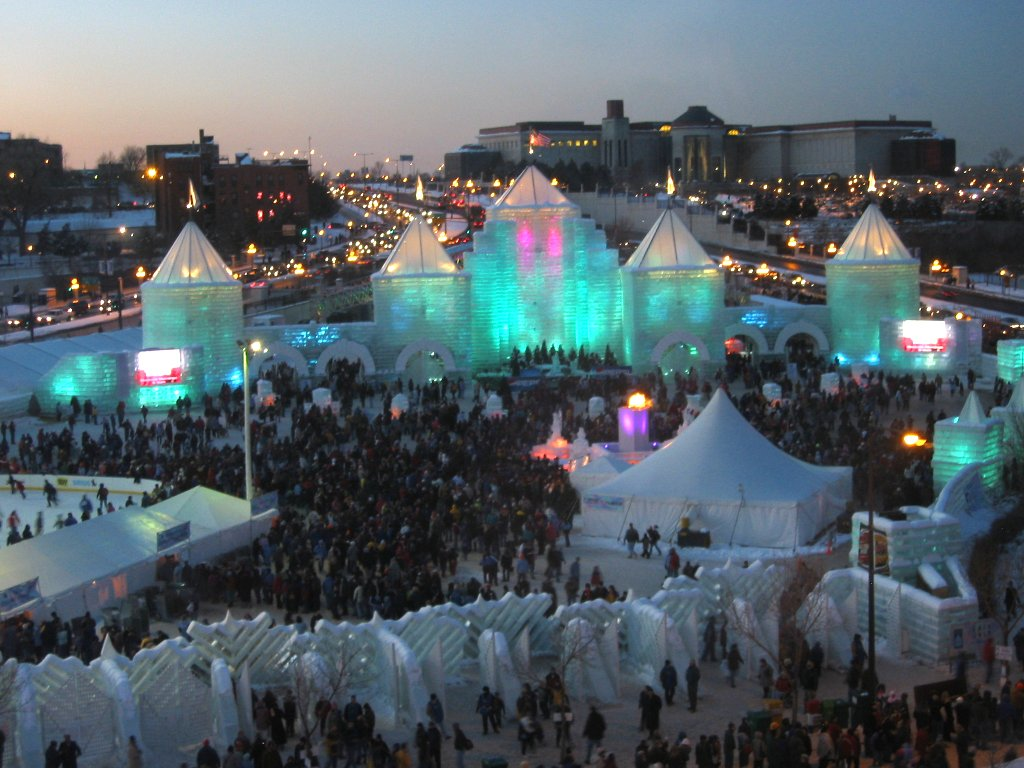
The 2004 Ice Palace

== History ==
In 1885, a New York reporter wrote that Saint Paul was, "another Siberia, unfit for human habitation" in winter. Offended by this attack on their city, the Saint Paul Chamber of Commerce decided to prove not only that Saint Paul was habitable but that its citizens were very much alive during winter, their most dominant season. A Winter Carnival had been held over the border in Montreal with an ice castle in 1885. With a model to draw upon, the Saint Paul Winter Carnival was created in 1886. It was followed by carnivals held in 1887, 1888 and 1896. The Carnival was held again in 1916 and 1917. There was another lapse until 1937 when they continued through 1942. WWII interrupted life in general, but the Carnival resumed in 1946. It remains an annual event today.

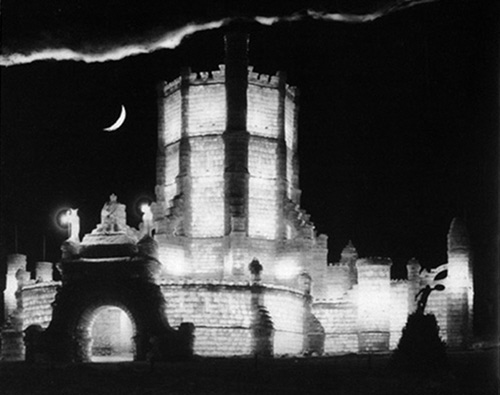
The 1887 Ice Palace

In 1886, King Boreas the First was crowned and the first Winter Carnival commenced. This festival also featured an ice palace, an elaborate creation made from the ice of Minnesota lakes, which has evolved into an internationally recognized icon for Saint Paul's festival.

The event featured many activities, including bobsledding and ice horse-racing. The former name uniquely and directly describes the activity as frozen lakes were used as race surfaces for sled-carts. The organizers say the event also served to bring the community closer together, including members of nearby Native American tribes. Many members of local tribes would ride into the city and pitch tents to participate in the Winter Carnival.

2021 had a drive-thru carnival and saw strict measures to combat the COVID-19 pandemic, such as wearing masks & social distancing.

== Today ==
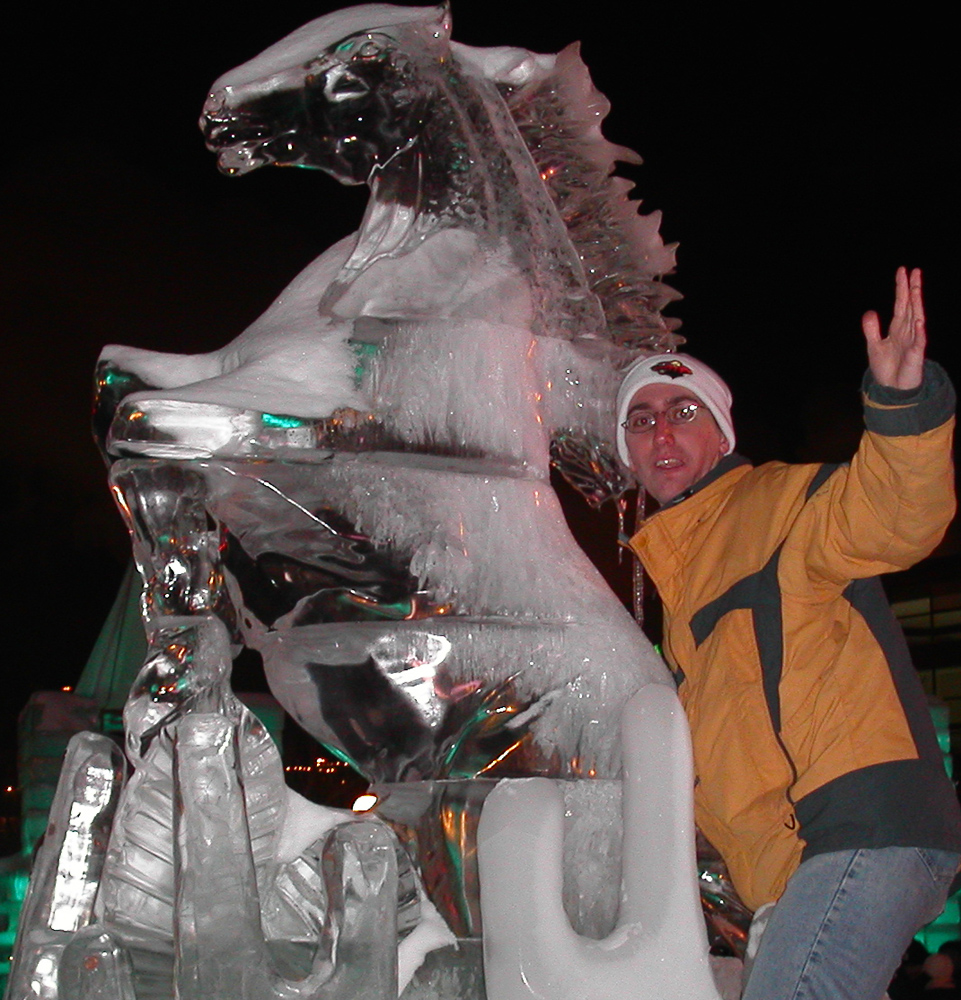
Man examines a Winter Carnival ice sculpture.

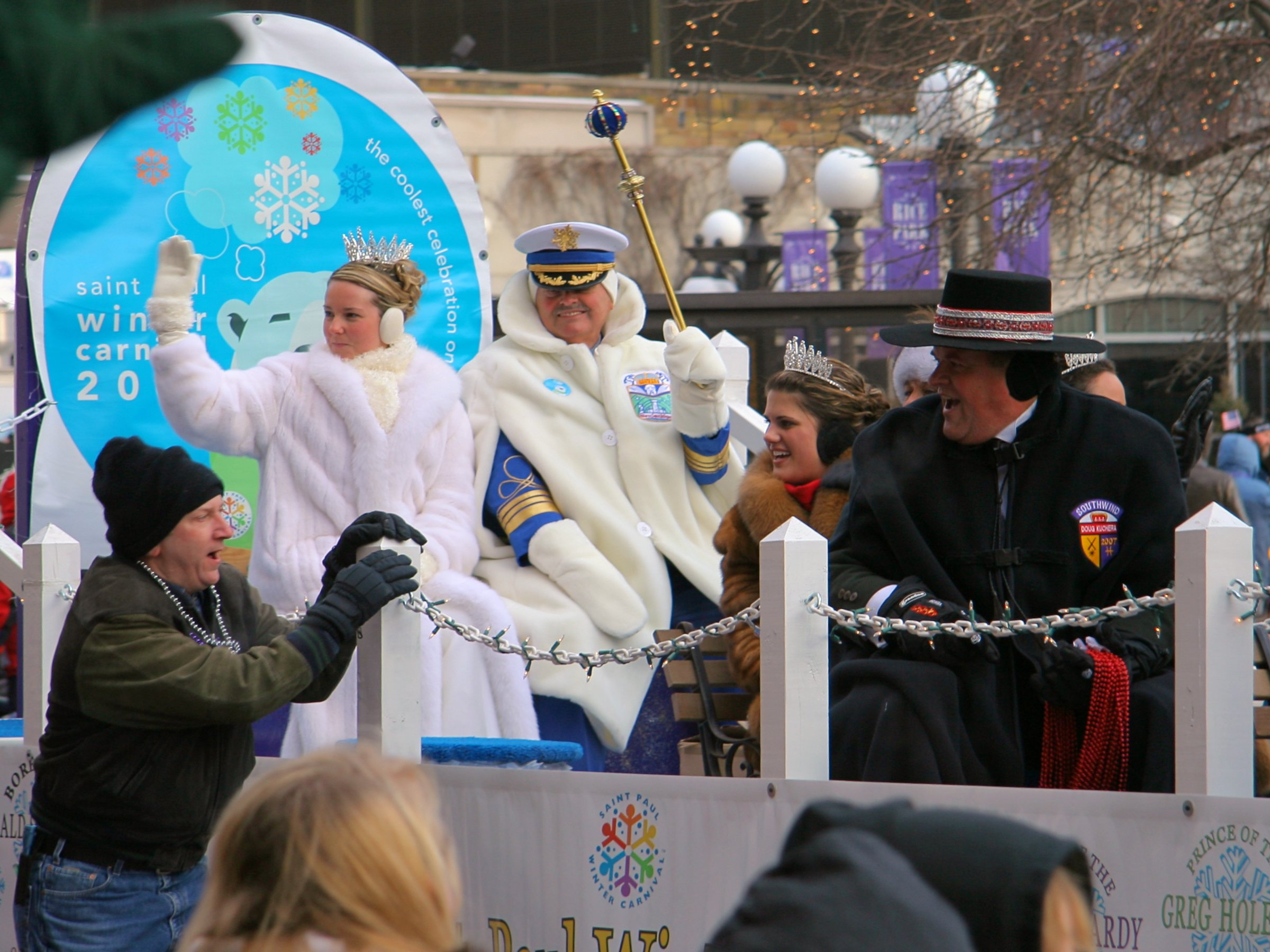
St. Paul Winter Carnival 2007

The Winter Carnival has grown over the years. The Royal Family makes over 400 appearances annually and participates in community activities around the Twin Cities Metro Area and the state of Minnesota. As a community organization, the members of the Royal Family and Vulcan Krewe travel throughout the US and Canada visiting different communities and engaging in various festivals. They aim to promote community awareness and volunteerism and to support charitable causes.

Saint Paul's George Latimer Central Library maintains a dedicated Winter Carnival collection in its St. Paul Room, including scrapbooks dating from 1937, newspaper and magazine clippings, photographs, programs, buttons and other ephemera that researchers and genealogists use throughout the year.

The Winter Carnival is held during January each year. It was not held during World War II out of respect for the conflict abroad. Currently the Winter Carnival runs the following events as part of the celebration:

- Royal Coronation
- Grand Day Parade
- Jigsaw Puzzle Competition (the largest in the nation)
- Hotdish Competition
- Family Day
- Frozen Family Fun Night
- Snow Sculpting
- Ice Sculpture Carving
- Klondike Kate Cabarets
- Historic Art Exhibit
- Torchlight Parade
- Winter Carnival Music Series
- Ice Bars
- Fire & Ice Run (5k distance and more)
- Beard Growing Competition

== Participating groups ==
=== Royal Family ===
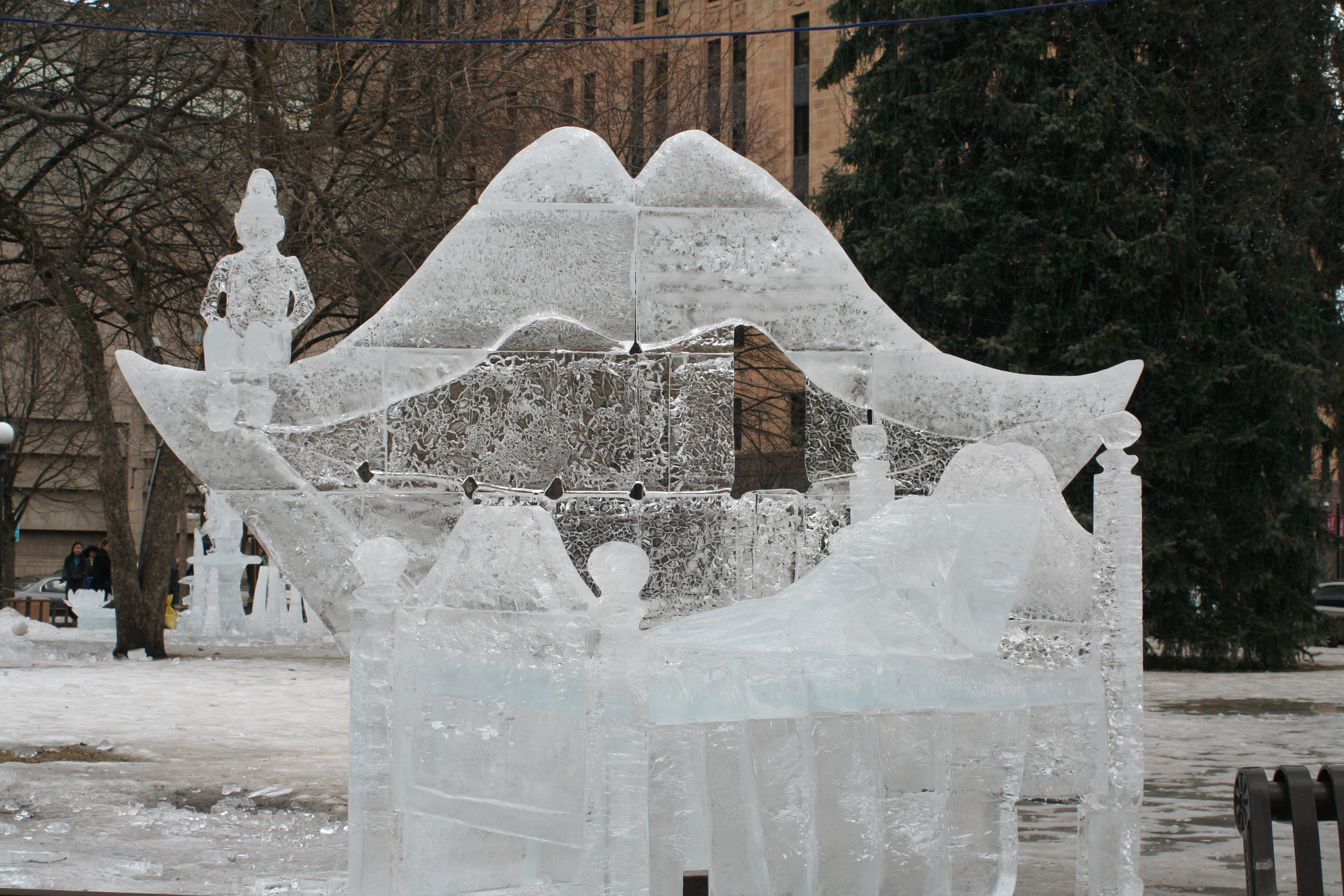
Tooth Fairies ice sculpture. (2008)

The Royal Family represents the Winter side of the Carnival Legend and is selected through each character's fraternal organization. In the case of the Queen of the Snows and the four Wind Princesses, a multi-month candidacy program including service events, interviews and appearances. The selection of the five Royal Ladies and official transition from one Royal Family to the next is announced at the Royal Coronation event. The Royal Family consists of:

- King Boreas (The true king of the St Paul Winter Carnival)
- Prime Minister
- Aurora, Queen of the Snows
- Captain of the King's Guard
- Sergeant of the King's Guard
- Titan, Prince of the North Wind
- North Wind Princess
- Euros, Prince of the East Wind
- East Wind Princess
- Zephyrus, Prince of the West Wind
- West Wind Princess
- Notos, Prince of the South Wind
- South Wind Princess
- A minimum of four King's Guards; one each assigned to guard one of the four princesses.
- Klondike Kate

=== Vulcan Krewe ===
The Vulcan Krewe represents the warm side of the Winter Carnival Legend. The Krewe is selected by the Order of Fire and Brimstone along with the new Fire King, Vulcanus Rex, each year. Each year a new Krewe is hand selected through an application and interview process. Selected Krewe members must complete a five-year commitment to become a full-fledged member of Fire and Brimstone. After a member's fifth year, that individual is then eligible to be a Fire King.

==== Members of the Vulcan Krewe ====
- Vulcanus Rex (The Vulc) - The True King of the Saint Paul Winter Carnival. Of all the members of the Krewe, he is the only one to wear red and black (all others wear only red).
- General Flameous (Flame) - The Army Commander and Keeper of the flame. Legend says that if the flame dies, the Fire King dies and it will be winter forever.
- The Duke of Klinker (Klinker) - The Fire King's aide-de-camp and the herder of the flock. The Klinker is the longest burning ember.
- The Count of Ashes (Ash) - The raiser of sleeping spirits. The "swinger" of the Krewe.
- The Prince of Soot (Sooty) - The recorder of past memories. The "ladies' man". Usually the oldest member of the Krewe.
- Baron Hot Sparkus (Sparky) - Commander of the Lancer’s Legion and the Stoker of Emotions. The "spark plug" of the Vulcan Krewe.
- Count Embrious (EB) - The Fire King’s Chancellor of the Exchequer. The young and romantic one. Usually the youngest member of the Krewe.
- Grand Duke Fertilious (Ferty) - Minister of Propaganda and the propagator of progeny. Usually the member with the most children.

==== Vulcan attire ====
The Fire King running suit, the uniform

In the early carnivals, when the Fire King ran alone, he wore typically kingly attire, crown and all, with heavy emphasis on the color red in the rest of the costume. In 1916, Ron Stewart, Vulcanus Rex I, wore a warm blanket coat with a wide sash and a headpiece with devil-type horns on it. This attire continued through 1939. Again, in 1940, Vulcanus Rex VI, E.R. Reiff, designed the basic running suit worn today. The horns were replaced by two feathers at the back of the head with a central fin running across the top of the head from front to back. In 1959 the feathers disappeared by order of Vulcanus Rex XXII, John Works. In February, 2012, Vulcanus Rex LXXV; Steve Robertson, began wearing a crown following the overthrow of Boreas to signify Vulcanus Rex as the Victorious King of the Saint Paul Winter Carnival. There are six primary pieces to the current running suit: the hat, the running suit, the cape, boots, gloves, goggles, and grease.

==== The Knighting Ceremony ====
These ceremonies were started in 1956. Every year, the Fire King "knights" hundreds of individuals. Special people are singled out by the king and his "Krewe" for this award. A knighting certificate consists of a "title" being bestowed, and a certificate being presented. Titles bestowed usually reflect the individual's special contribution to a community, company, club or organization, or family.

==== The Royal Chariot ====
The current fire engine being used by the Krewe was built in 1932 by Luverne Fire Apparatus of Luverne, Minnesota. Starting out in 1932 as Saint Paul Squad 1 and in 1940 becoming a reserve hose cart, it is believed to be the only one of its type left. The City of Saint Paul began allowing the Krewe to use this fire engine in the late 1950s. Over the years the fire engine has been rebuilt many times while maintaining most of the original body and frame. In 1996, Fire & Brimstone took over ownership and upkeep of the truck.

==== The Order of Fire and Brimstone ====
In the late 1940s some of the former Krewe members formed a group that included only former Vulcans. In 1958 it was made into a fully incorporated organization. Fire & Brimstone is run by a board of directors that is elected by the general membership at their annual meeting. This board's main objective is to provide support for the Vulcan Krewe and also to plan many activities and events for F&B members and their families to attend throughout the year.

== Medallion hunt ==
Starting in 1952, each year during the carnival, there is an annual treasure hunt. The Saint Paul Pioneer Press prints in their newspaper 12 clues on 12 consecutive days. These clues point to a local park, where participants race to the park they think the clues point them towards, and start searching for the medallion. The clues are often cryptic until the 12th day, when people line up outside the newspaper offices, cell phones in hand and partners in parks, when the 12th clue gives them almost the exact location. The medallion has previously been hidden in a diaper, a White Castle hamburger box, a pop can, inside an Oreo cookie, and frozen in ice. The finders of the medallion are awarded up to $10,000 and receive a place of honor riding in the closing Torchlight Parade.

== Ice Palace ==
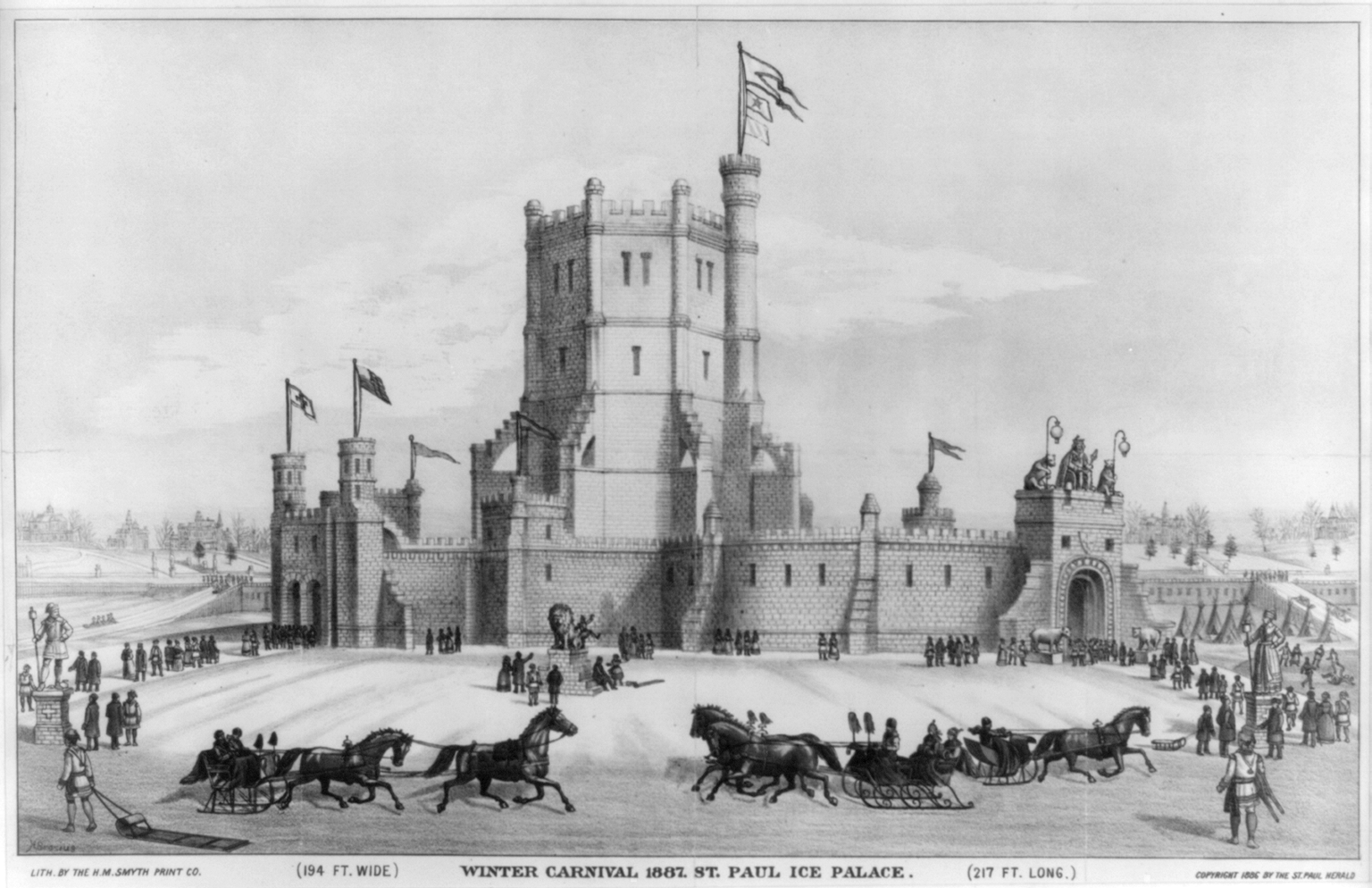
1887 ice palace

To date, the St. Paul Winter Carnival has built 42 Ice Palaces. Ice palaces have been built in 1886, 1887, 1888, 1896, 1917, 1937, 1939, 1940, 1941, 1986, 1988, 1992, 2004, 2018, and since 2021, among other years. The 1986 ice palace was the tallest ice castle ever built at the time, measuring 128 feet 9 inches (39.2 meters) high.

== See also ==
- Winter festival
