= Winter festival =

Outdoor celebration that occurs in wintertime

A winter festival, winter carnival, snow festival, or frost fair is an outdoor cold weather celebration that occurs in wintertime.

Winter festivals are popular in D climates (see Köppen climate classification) where winter is particularly long or severe, such as Siberia, Scandinavia, Canada and the northern United States. Most winter carnivals involve traditional winter pursuits such as dog sledding, ice hockey, ice carving, skating, skiing, and snow carving.

Some notable winter carnivals include:

World

- Winter Olympic Games

Argentina

- Snow Festival - held in Bariloche

Canada

- Bon Soo Winter Carnival - held in Sault Sainte Marie, Ontario
- Festival du Voyageur - held in St. Boniface in Winnipeg, Manitoba
- Ice on Whyte Festival - held in Edmonton, Alberta
- Parc Jean Drapeau Winter Festival - held in Montreal, Quebec
- Quebec Winter Carnival - held in Quebec City, Quebec
- Snowking Winter Festival - held in Yellowknife, Northwest Territories
- Winter Festival of Lights - held in Niagara Falls, Ontario
- Winterlude - held in the National Capital Region along the Ontario-Quebec border

Chile

- Fiesta de la Nieve - held in Puerto Williams

China

- Changbai Mountain International Winter Carnival - held in Erdaobaihe
- Harbin International Ice and Snow Sculpture Festival - held in Harbin, Heilongjiang

England

- River Thames frost fairs - formerly held in London, England between the 17th century and early 19th century

Estonia

- Tallinn Christmas Market - held in Tallinn

Finland

- Lahti Ski Games

France

- Concours International de Sculpture sur Glace et sur Neige - held in Valloire

Japan

- Asahikawa Winter Festival - held in Asahikawa, Hokkaidō
- Chitose Lake Shikotsu Ice Festival - held in Chitose, Hokkaidō
- Iwate Snow Festival - held in Iwate-gun, Iwate Prefecture
- Lake Shikaribetsu Kotan - held on top of frozen Lake Shikaribetsu in Shikaoi, Hokkaidō
- Sapporo Snow Festival - held in Sapporo, Hokkaido
- Tokamachi Snow Festival - held in Tōkamachi, Niigata Prefecture

Latvia

- International Ice Sculpture Festival - held in Jelgava

New Zealand

- Queenstown Winter Festival - held in Queenstown, New Zealand

Norway

- Holmenkollen Ski Festival - held in Holmenkollen, Oslo
- Ice Music Festival - held in Geilo

Russia

- International Festival-Competition of Snow and Ice Sculpture - held in Krasnoyarsk
- Perm International Snow and Ice Sculpture Festival - held in Perm

Sweden

- Swedish Ski Games - held in Falun, Sweden

United States

- Annual frost faire at Saratoga National Historical Park - held in Saratoga County, New York
- Bavarian IceFest - held in Leavenworth, Washington
- Budweiser International Snow Sculpture Championships - held in Breckenridge, Colorado
- Dartmouth Winter Carnival - held in Hanover, New Hampshire
- Michigan Technological University's Winter Carnival - held in Houghton, Michigan
- Saint Paul Winter Carnival - held in Saint Paul, Minnesota
- City of Lakes Loppet - held in Minneapolis, Minnesota
- Saranac Lake Winter Carnival - held in Saranac Lake, New York
- Steamboat Springs Winter Carnival - held in Steamboat Springs, Colorado
- Wintersköl™ - held in Aspen, Colorado
- World Ice Art Championships - held in Fairbanks, Alaska

== See also ==
- Christmas market
- List of Christmas markets
- List of ice and snow sculpture events
- Winter light festival
