= Snowking Winter Festival =

Annual festival in Yellowknife, Canada

Coordinates: 62°27′21″N 114°21′09″W

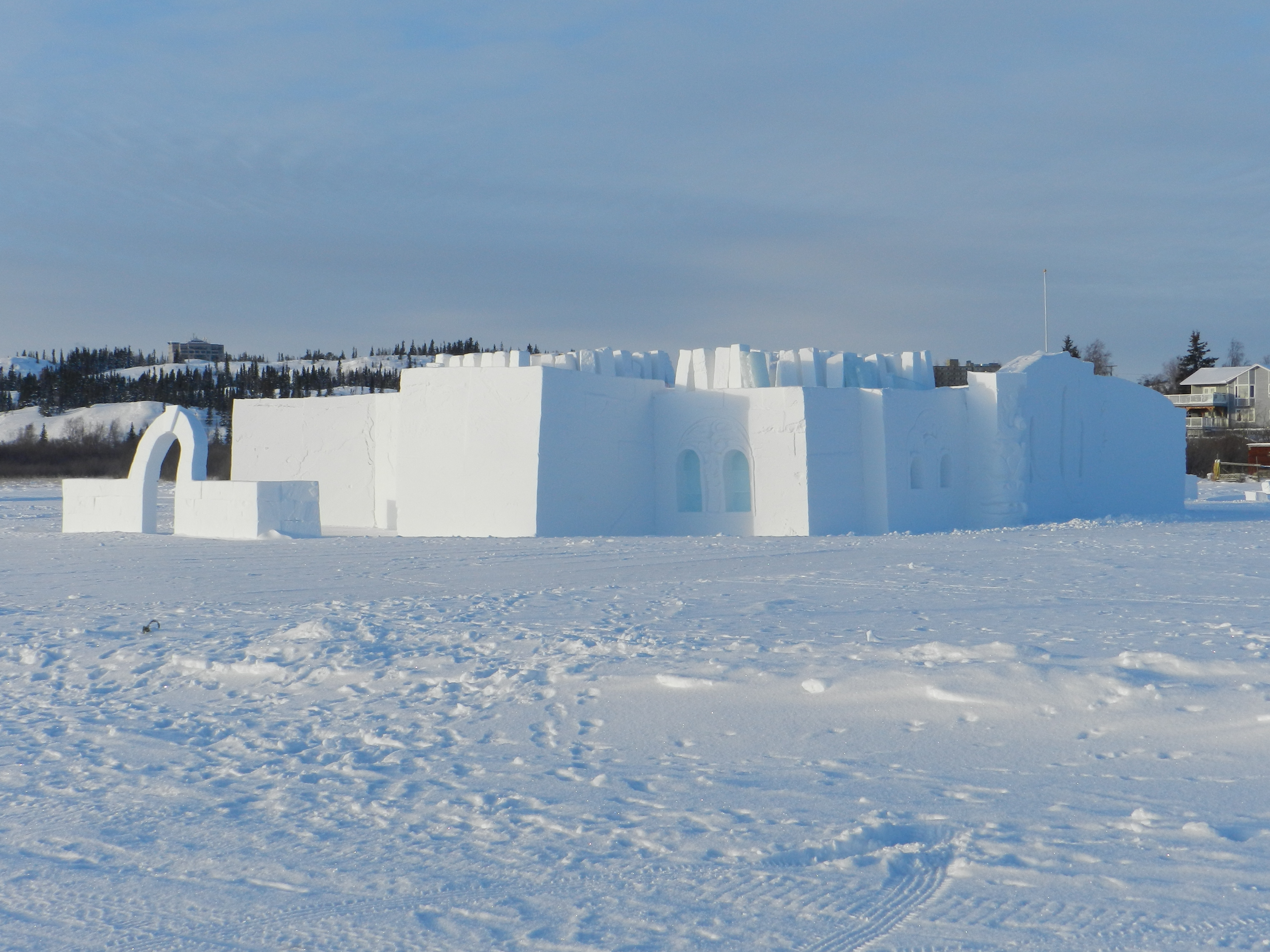
The annual snowcastle on Great Slave Lake, Yellowknife, 2013

The Snowking Winter Festival is an annual festival held each March in Yellowknife, Northwest Territories, Canada since 1996.

The festival is held in a snow castle, built from snow with window panes and other features made of ice. Each winter the castle is built on Yellowknife Bay, on Great Slave Lake. The castle is designed and the construction is supervised by Snowking, Anthony Foliot. The design evolves every year and the castle has grown to include an auditorium, cafe, courtyard, slide, parapets and turrets.

Once it is completed, the snow castle becomes a hub for winter arts activity in Yellowknife. The month-long festival includes concerts, art shows, children's theatre, and more. Carvers augment the castle with snow and ice sculptures.

== History ==
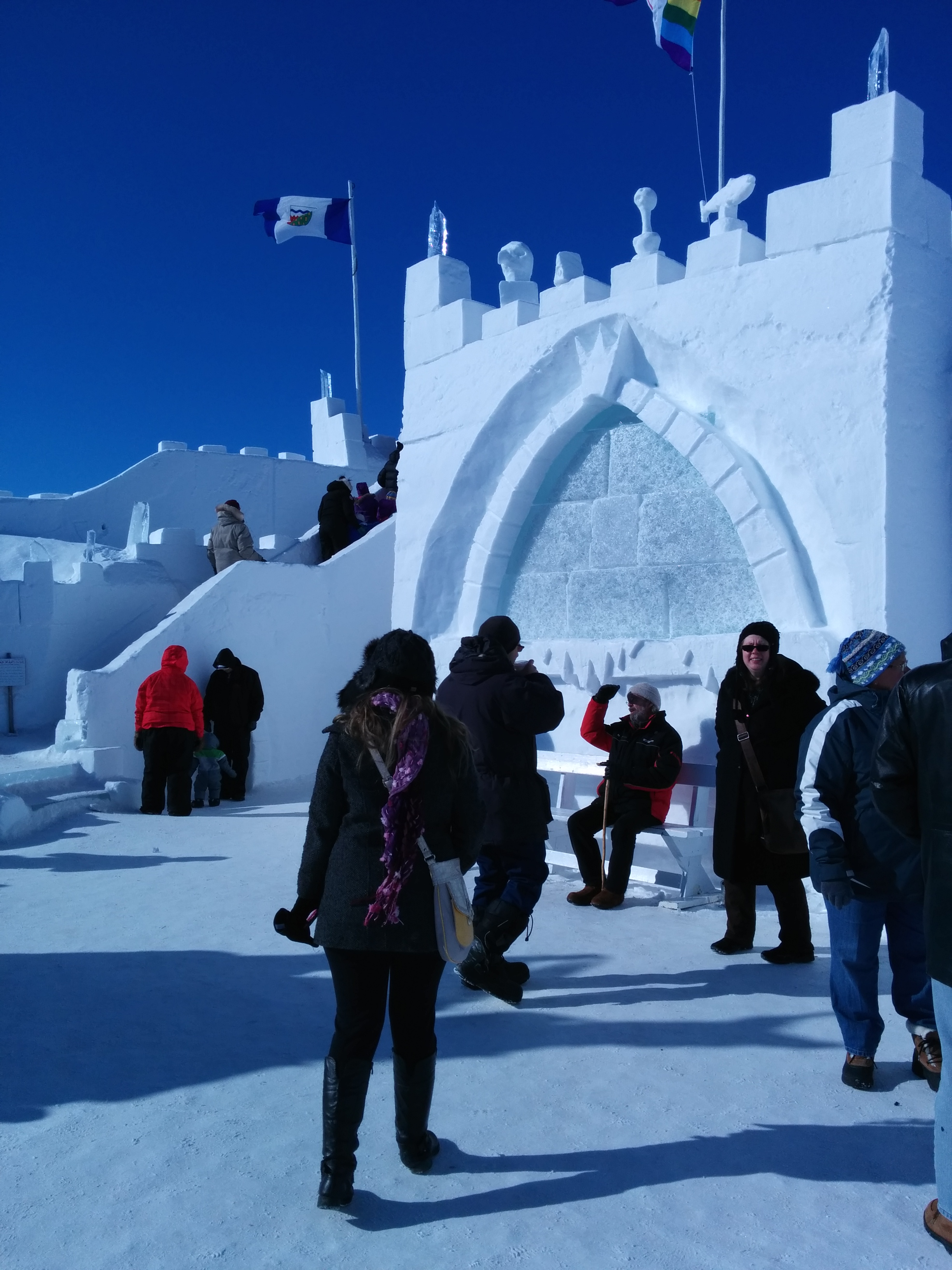
Courtyard of the ice castle, 2014

The first Snowking castle was built in 1996. From humble beginnings in Yellowknife's Woodyard neighbourhood, where the castle was little more than tunnels in snowbanks augmented by blocks of snow cut from wind-formed snow drifts, the Snowking's Winter Festival has grown into a month-long event based around a large castle built of snow.

In the early years, Snowking and Sir Shiverin' Sam built forts of snow with their children near their homes on the shore of Yellowknife Bay. Over the years, the "castle" grew, and at some point moved out onto the ice of the bay. Each year the structure became larger and more elaborate. Crew members came and went over the years, but the Snowking remained dedicated to his kingdom. Funding was secured so that the castle could continue to operate and to grow each year. In 2009, the Government of Canada provided $16,900 of funding for the 2009 festival via the Building Communities Through Arts and Heritage Program of the Department of Canadian Heritage. In 2004, Foliot received $5,000 from the Northwest Territories Business Development Fund for the operation of the festival.

== The Festival ==
Throughout the month of March, the castle hosts a film night, children's plays on the weekends, and live music most Friday and Saturday nights. It also hosts puppet shows and hockey games.

== See also ==
- Winter festival
