= Snow in Mongolia =

Mongolian meteorological conditions

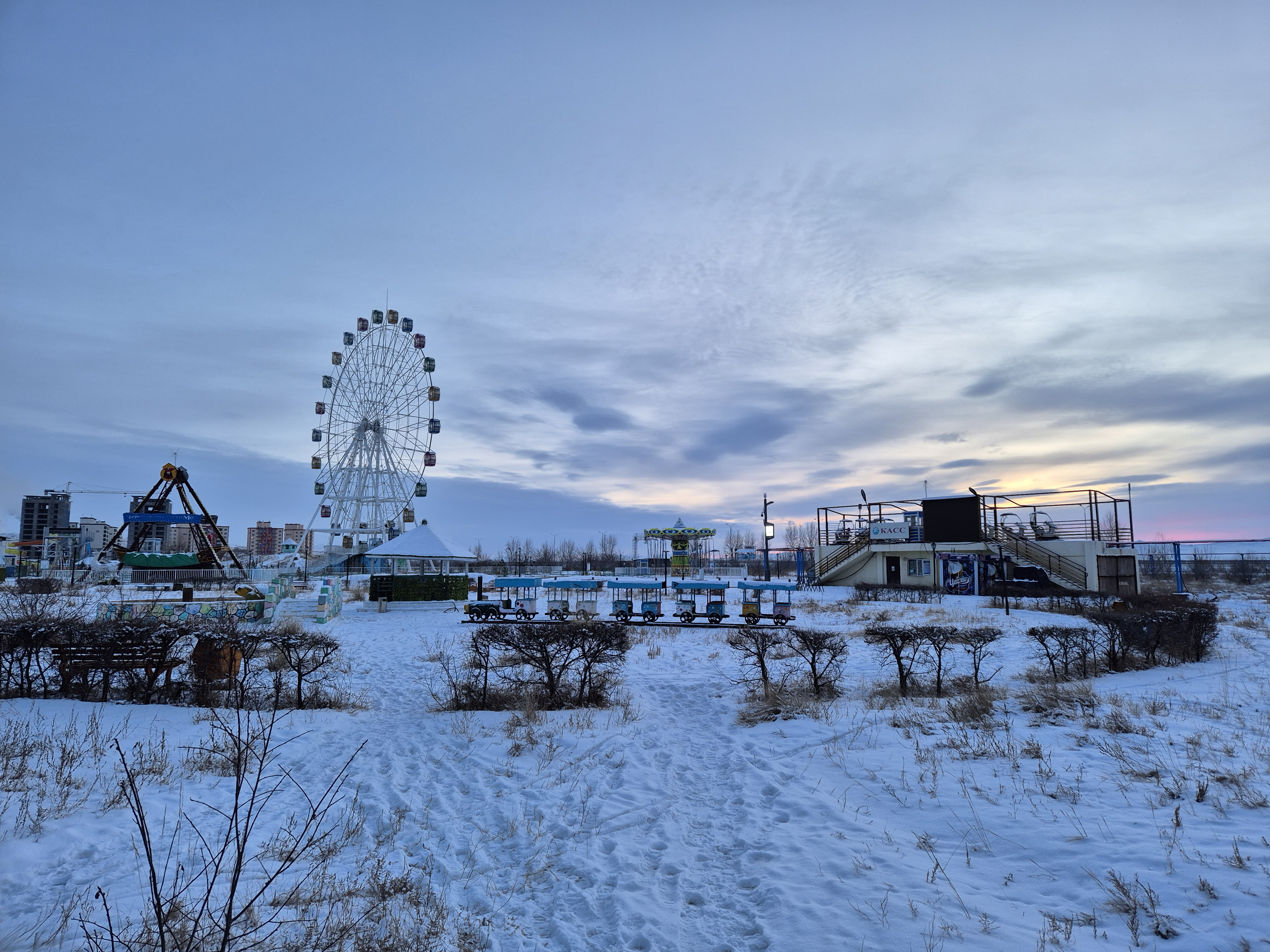
Snow in Darkhan City, Darkhan-Uul, Mongolia

In late November 2015, snow covered up to 90% of the territory of Mongolia.

== History ==
On 26 December 1966, Mongolia recorded its coldest temperature ever at minus 55.6°C at Züüngovi District of Uvs Province.

== By regions ==
=== Ulaanbaatar ===
In response to heavy snowfall in late December 2024, Ulaanbaatar launched an extensive snow removal operation, employing 1,200 workers from the city's sanitation service companies and 35 other organizations. More than 180 specialized vehicles and machinery were used. The main materials used were deicing chemicals and salt.

== See also ==
- Geography of Mongolia
