= Alexandre Falguière =

French sculptor and painter (1831–1900)

Jean Alexandre Joseph Falguière
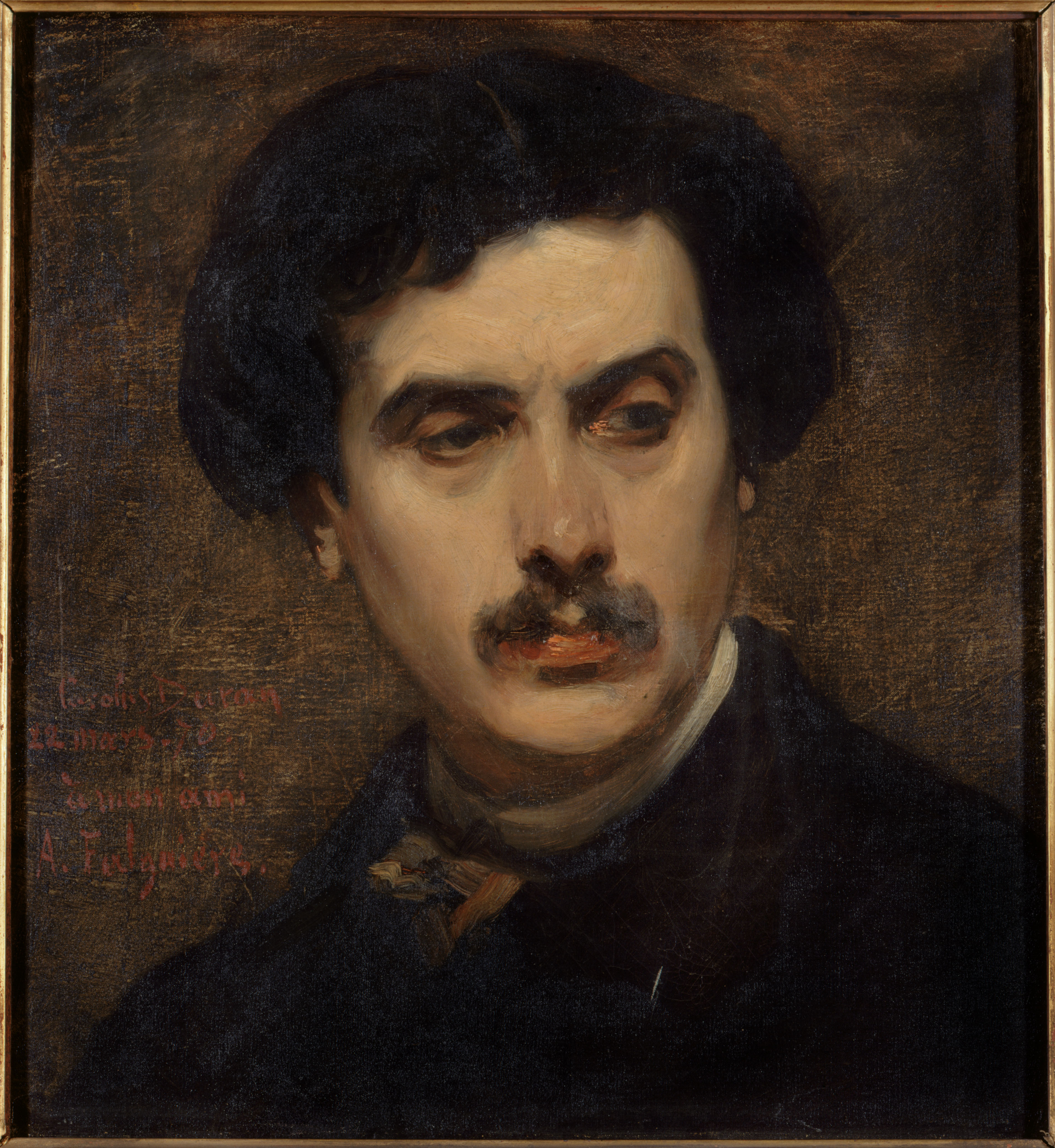
- Portrait of Alexandre Falguière (1870), by Carolus-Duran
- Born: 7 September 1831; Toulouse, France
- Died: 20 April 1900 (aged 68); Paris, France
- Resting place: Père Lachaise Cemetery
- Education: École des Beaux-Arts
- Known for: Sculpture, Painting

Jean Alexandre Joseph Falguière (French pronunciation: [ʒɑ̃ alɛksɑ̃dʁ ʒozɛf falɡjɛʁ]; also given as Jean-Joseph-Alexandre Falguière, or in short Alexandre Falguière) (7 September 1831 – 20 April 1900) was a French sculptor and painter.

== Biography ==
Falguière was born in Toulouse. A pupil of the École des Beaux-Arts, he won the Prix de Rome in 1859; he was awarded the medal of honor at the Paris Salon of 1868 and was appointed Officer of the Legion of Honor in 1878.

Falguière's first bronze statue of importance was The Victor of the Cockfight (1864), and Tarcisius the Christian Boy-Martyr followed in 1867; both were exhibited in the Luxembourg Museum and are now in the Musée d'Orsay. His more important monuments are those to Admiral Courbet (1890) at Abbeville and the famous Joan of Arc. Other works include Eve (1880), Diana (1882 and 1891), Woman and Peacock (a.k.a. Juno and The Peacock), and The Poet, astride his Pegasus spreading wings for flight. He sculpted The Dancer, based on Cléo de Mérode which today is also in the Musée d'Orsay. In 1870 he helped create the snow sculpture, La statue de la Résistance.

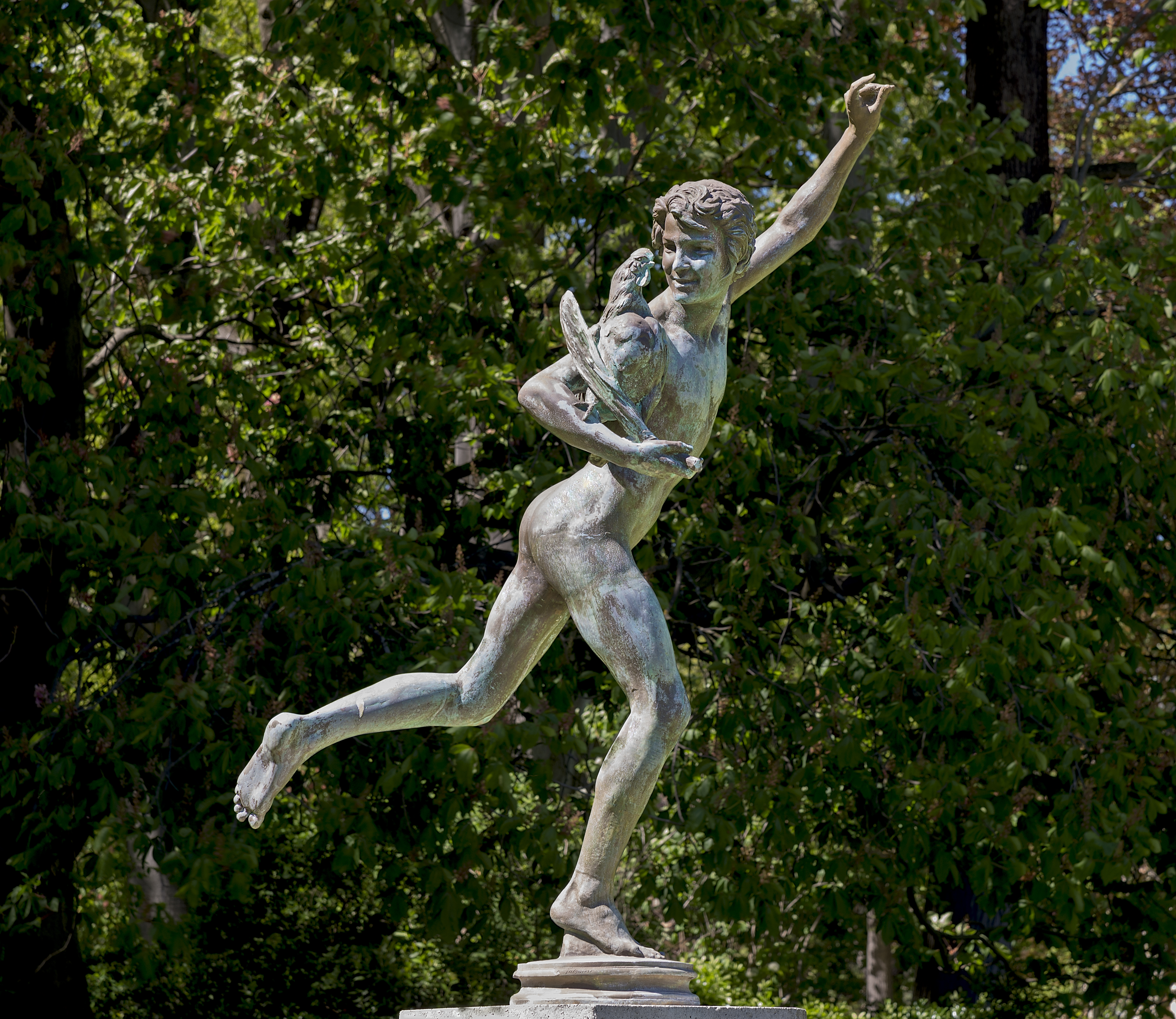
Falguière's The Victor of the Cockfight (1864)

To these works should be added his monuments to Cardinal Lavigerie and to Marquis de Lafayette (in Washington, DC), and his statues of Alphonse de Lamartine (1876) and St Vincent de Paul (1879), as well as the Honoré de Balzac, which he executed for the Société des gens de lettres on their rejection of that by Auguste Rodin; and the busts of Carolus-Duran and Ernest Alexandre Honoré Coquelin (1896).

Falguière was a painter as well. His Wrestlers (1875) and Fan and Dagger (1882; a defiant Spanish woman) were in the Luxembourg, and other pictures of importance are The Beheading of St John the Baptist (1877), The Sphinx (1883), Acis and Galatea (1885), Old Woman and Child (1886) and In the Bull Slaughter-House. He also taught; among his students were Francis Edwin Elwell, Ernest Henri Dubois, Julien Caussé, Laurent Marqueste, Henri Crenier and Théophile Barrau. He became a member of the Institut de France (Académie des Beaux-Arts) in 1882.

Falguière died in Paris in 1900 and was interred there in the Père Lachaise Cemetery, where his monument is by his pupil Marqueste.

== See also ==
- List of works by Alexandre Falguière
- Léonce Bénédite (biographer)
