= Snow sculpture =

Sculpture carved out of snow

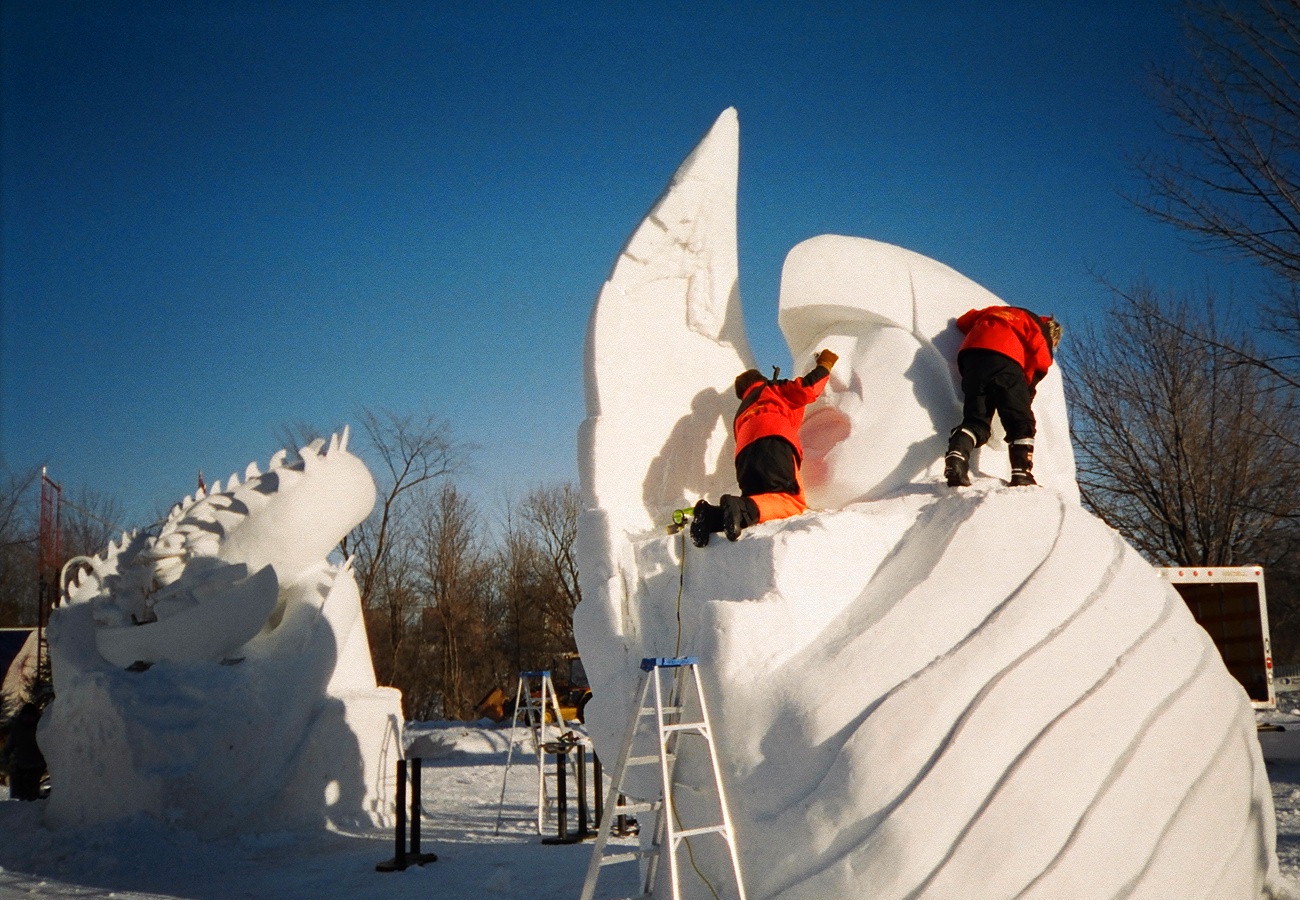
Winterlude snow sculpting

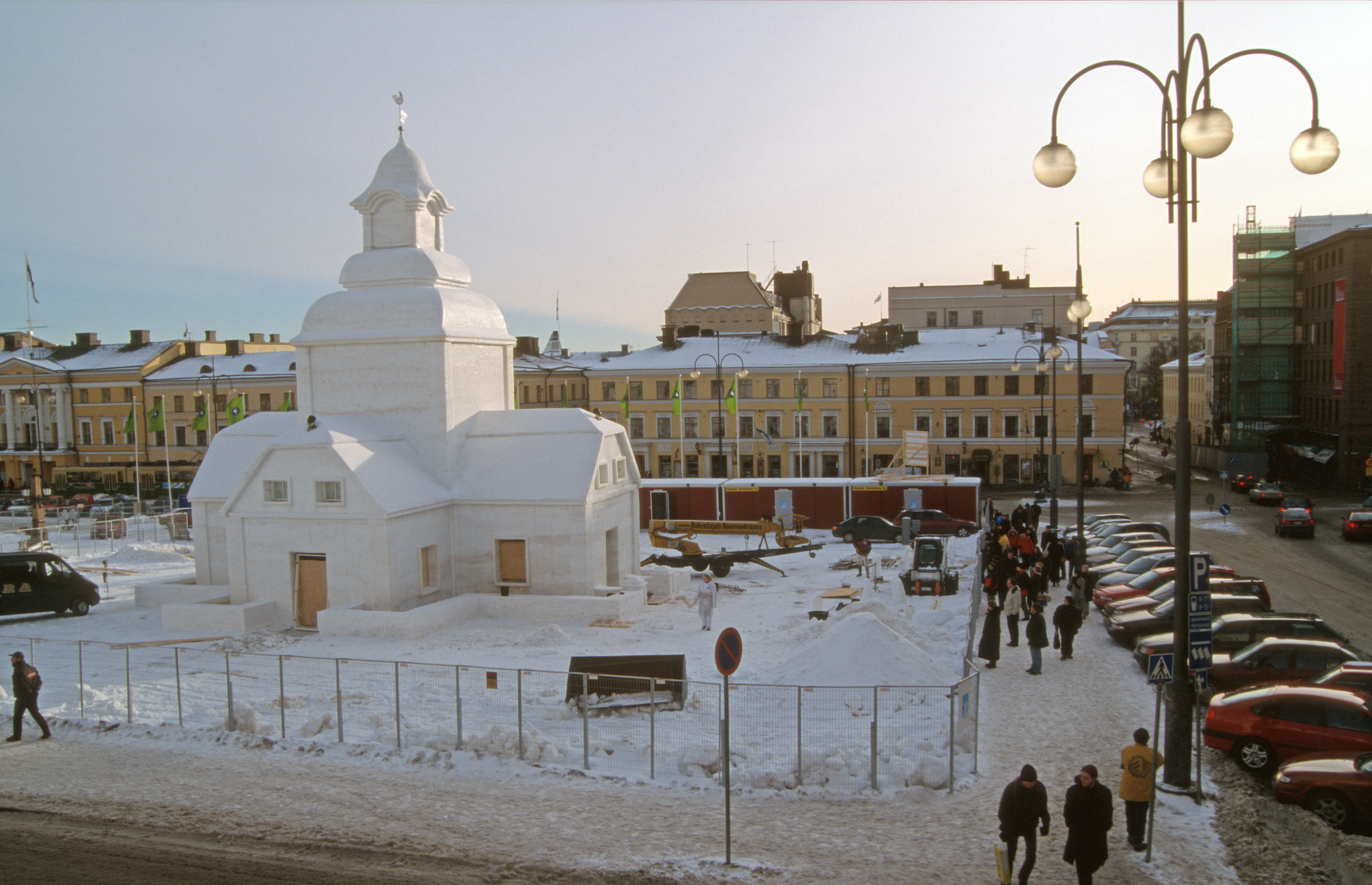
Snow sculpture version of the Ulrika Eleonora Church being constructed on the Senate Square, Helsinki in 2000

Snow sculpture, snow carving or snow art is a sculpture form comparable to sand sculpture or ice sculpture in that most of it is now practiced outdoors often in full view of spectators, thus giving it kinship to performance art. The materials and the tools differ widely, but often include hand tools such as shovels, pickle forks, homemade tools, and saws. Snow sculptures are usually carved out of a single block of snow about 6–15 ft (1.8–4.6 m) on each side and weighing about 20–30 tons. The snow is densely packed into a form after having been produced by artificial means or collected from the ground after a snowfall.

== Events ==
There are a number of international ice and snow sculpting events around the world.

=== Canada ===
Since 1973 there has been an international snow sculpture contest during the Quebec City Winter Carnival and more recently the Winterlude celebrations (in Ottawa) have had snow sculpture events.

=== China ===
Harbin International Ice and Snow Sculpture Festival originated in Harbin's traditional ice lantern show and garden party that takes place in winter, which began in 1963 in Heilongjiang, China. It was interrupted for a number of years during the Cultural Revolution, but has been resumed and was announced as an annual event at Zhaolin Park on January 5 in 1985.

=== United States ===
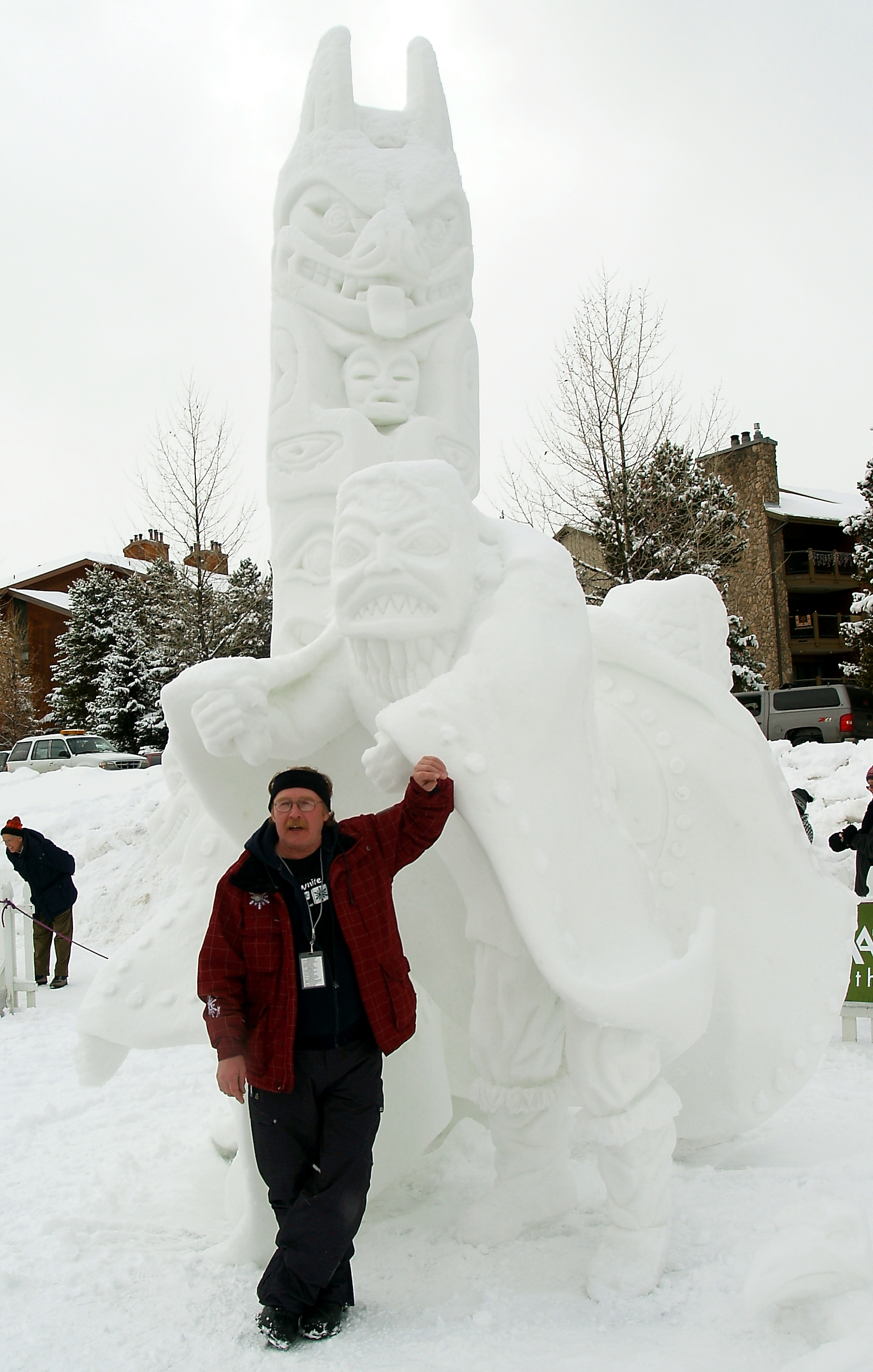
Canadian sculptor Michael Lane, in front of Family Reunion, which won First Place at the 2009 Breckenridge, Colorado International Snow Sculpture Championships

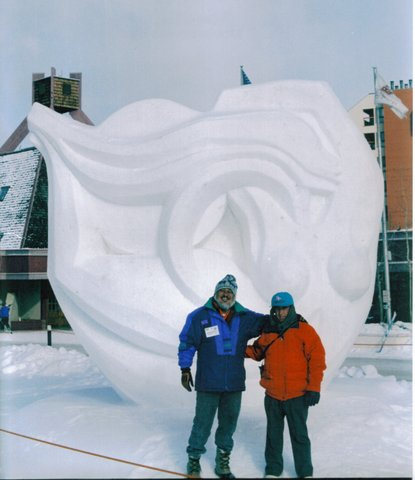
Mexican sculptor Abel Ramírez Águilar posing with a piece he created in Breckenridge, Colorado

The Saint Paul Winter, which hosts snow and ice carving competitions, is the oldest winter carnival in the world; the first one was held in 1886. The Minnesota State Snow Sculpting Competition is held during Winter Carnival every year during the last weekend in January at the Minnesota State Fairgrounds, and is a qualifier for the US National Snow Sculpting Competition. Like Minnesota, many states hold their own competitions with a national event being held in Lake Geneva, Wisconsin each year.

The annual Winter Carnival at Michigan Technological University has been a tradition since 1922. These sculptures are not carved from a single block, but rather many blocks made over a month. For this reason, they can grow quite large (up to the regulated 28 feet tall and sometimes over 80–123 feet long). Each year a theme is given for the winter carnival and the statues are created in the set theme. Student groups compete against each other in different divisions.

Frankenmuth, Michigan hosts a massive snow and ice sculpture festival in late January with teams traveling to carve from all over the globe. Frankenmuth's Snowfest consists of many ice carving competitions and snow sculpting competitions at elementary, high school, state, national, and international levels.

The Breckenridge International Snow Sculpture Championships in Breckenridge, Colorado, began in 1990. A group of local snow sculptors called Team Breck, which was part of the Colorado State Snow Sculpture Championships held in Breckenridge, joined with the city and Breckenridge Ski Resort to begin an annual competition. In 2009 teams from China, Spain, the Netherlands and other countries competed. The winner was Team Canada–Yukon, led by sculptor Donald Watt.

The US National Snow Sculpting Championship organized by Winterfun USA is the only national snow sculpting championship in the United States. 15 state-champion teams work during a 3-day competition using their artistry to creating remarkable, larger-than-life snow sculptures. Competing states include Wisconsin, Minnesota, Iowa, Michigan, Colorado, North Dakota, Alaska, Florida, Nebraska, Illinois, New Hampshire, Vermont, and New York.

The World Snow Sculpting Championship is held yearly in Stillwater, MN. This event hosts snow sculpting teams from around the world from countries such as the United States, Mexico, Argentina, Germany, Turkey, Canada, Finland, and Ecuador. The first World Snow Sculpting Championship was held in Stillwater in January 2022. In the United States, the US National Snow Sculpting Championship is the qualifier for the world competition sending the winning team from the National Championship from the year before.

== TV Show ==
In November 2022 Disney+ debuted the snow sculpting competition show named "Best in Snow". Featuring teams from around the world in a competition for the title of Best in Snow, by transforming blocks of snow into creations inspired by Pixar, Marvel, Walt Disney Animation, Walt Disney Studios, and The Muppets Studios.

== See also ==
- Snowman
- Ice sculpture
- Michigan Technological University's Winter Carnival
- La statue de la Résistance
