= Icebar Orlando =

Coordinates: 28.4347°N 81.4718°W

- The logo of Icebar Orlando
- Type: Drinking establishment
- Industry: Ice bar
- Headquarters: Orlando, Florida
- Website: www.icebarorlando.com

Icebar Orlando (stylized as ICEBAR Orlando) is an ice bar located in International Drive in Orlando, Florida. At over 5,200 square feet (480 m^{2}), the company claims that it is the world's largest permanent ice bar. Its decor, furniture and glassware are constructed entirely of ice, and the bar also has various ice carvings. Icebar Orlando also runs a bar and nightclub named the Fire Lounge, which is located next to the ice bar and is maintained at a standard room temperature.

== Overview ==
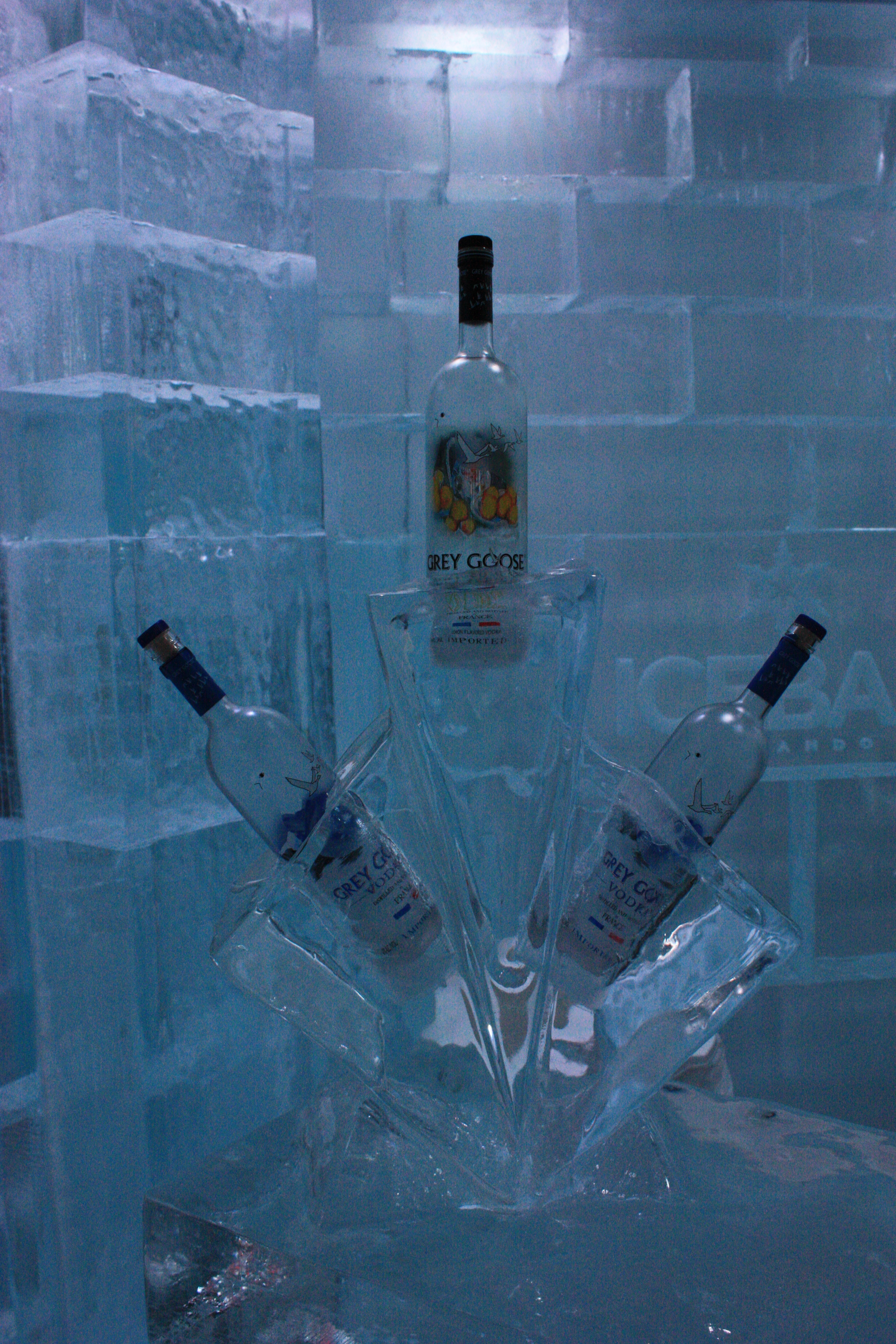
Vodka bottles in an ice sculpture at Icebar Orlando

Icebar Orlando is composed of over 70 tons of carved ice, and is maintained at a temperature of 27 °F (−3 °C). Its interior, including the furniture such as couches, tables and chairs, walls, sculptures and various decor, is entirely constructed out of ice. It also has a fireplace sculpted in the appearance of Old Man Winter, which is fired with low-watt electric flames. Icebar Orlando was first sculpted by Aaron Costic, an Ohio-based artist. The facility was later expanded in 2008 by ice sculptor David Berman. In 2008, the projected monthly electric bill for Icebar Orlando was $3,500. Bioclimatic filters are used to reduce electricity costs.

People of all ages are allowed to visit Icebar Orlando, and are provided with an insulated thermal cape and gloves to endure the coldness and keep patrons comfortable. An admission fee is charged, adults are provided with an alcoholic drink, and those under the legal drinking age of 21 are provided with a non-alcoholic drink. Drinks are served in glasses made out of ice by servers wearing fur hats and snow suits. For safety reasons, visitors are allowed to remain inside the ice bar for only 45 minutes, and the bar also serves warm drinks. Staff is on a rotational schedule, whereby they are in the facility for 30 minutes and then outside of it for 15 minutes. Some staff members, such as bartenders, bundle up in several layers of clothing to keep warm.

Events are hosted at Icebar Orlando, such as an annual New Year's Eve masquerade ball. and the Kickoff Afterparty for the annual nearby MegaCon. It has been described as a popular meeting place in central Florida. (Note: "the neighboring IceBar Orlando also on International Drive, which is among Central Florida's top meeting spaces, according to Orlando Business Journal research.")

== The Fire Lounge ==
The Fire Lounge (stylized as "FIRE Lounge") is a bar and nightclub that is also located at Icebar Orlando, and is maintained at a normal room temperature. Visitors to Icebar Orlando are first led through the Fire Lounge, where they are provided with gloves and a thermal cape.

== In mass media ==
Icebar Orlando has been featured in Extreme Barhopping on the Travel Channel, America's Best Cook on the Food Network, and Drinking Made Easy with comedian Zane Lamprey on HDNet.
