= List of Mysterious Joker episodes =

The Mysterious Joker anime television series is based on manga series of the same name written and illustrated by Hideyasu Takahashi. The anime is produced by Asatsu DK, animated by Shin-Ei Animation, and is directed by Yukiyo Teramoto. The series was broadcast on Tokyo MX in Japan since October 6, 2014, and was also aired on Kids Station since October 16, 2014, and broadcast on TV Hokkaido in 2017. The series is simulcasted by Crunchyroll under the title Joker. The series' opening theme is "Kaitō Miracle Shōnen Boy" (怪盗ミラクル少年ボーイ Phantom Thief Miracle Young Boy) by Aruka Rider, and the ending theme is "Parade Illusion" (パレード・イリュージョン) by Mainya with Shuffle Sisters.

== Episodes ==
=== Season 1 (2014–2015) ===
No. overall	No. in season	Title	Original air date
1	1	"The Miracle Maker Appears"; Transliteration: "Miracle Maker Arawaru" (Japanese: 奇跡の怪盗（ミラクルメイカー）あらわる)	October 6, 2014
The phantom thief Joker plans on stealing the Dragon Gem, which is located inside the Kaneari mansion. While infiltrating the mansion, he meets a clumsy ninja Hachi, who is after the treasure as well since it belongs to his village. Hachi, amazed by Joker's tricks, begs Joker let him be Joker's apprentice.
2	2	"Paris and the 100-Year Safe"; Transliteration: "Paris to Hyaku-Nen Kinko" (Japanese: 芸術の都（パリ）と百年金庫)	October 13, 2014
Joker and his new apprentice, Hachi, travel to Paris in order to steal the Recollection of Napoleon, which is hidden inside a 100-year safe that only opens up every 100 years. However, they have to deal with a detective, who does everything he can to prevent the thieves from stealing the painting.
3	3	"The Mermaid and the Ship of Fakes"; Transliteration: "Mermaid to Itsuwari no Fune" (Japanese: 人魚（マーメイド）と偽りの船)	October 22, 2014
Joker and Hachi sneak inside Kaneari's private luxury cruise in order to steal the Mermaid's Crystal. They end up coming across Joker's rival Spade, also known as King, and his assistant, Dark Eye. The group join forces to steal the treasure, though Joker and Spade keep grudging against each other.
4	4	"The Heroes of Ice and Flame"; Transliteration: "Kōri to Honō no Yūsha-tachi" (Japanese: 氷と炎の勇者たち)	November 3, 2014
Joker plans on stealing the Ice Sculpture of Odin, which is on display on the 88th floor on a skyscraper known as the Valhalla Tower. Later, he and Hachi discover that Spade and Dark Eye are after the treasure as well, and he and Spade compete with each other to steal the treasure first.
5	5	"Journey into the Shining Night"; Transliteration: "Kagayakuyoru he no Tabidachi" (Japanese: 輝く夜への旅立ち)	November 10, 2014
While cleaning Joker's room, Hachi discovers a key that belonged to Joker's father. The episode then flashbacks to Joker's childhood when his father challenged him to find the key that was hidden somewhere in the family mansion.
6	6	"The Shadow Descends"; Transliteration: "Shadow wa Maiorita" (Japanese: 影（シャドウ）は舞い降りた)	November 17, 2014
Joker is framed for performing robberies at art museums around the world, however, he doesn't remember doing any of it. The robberies were actually performed by a rival phantom thief Shadow Joker, who looks a lot like Joker. Later, Joker, Hachi, Spade, and Dark Eye discover that Shadow Joker is after the Gemini Crown, located at the Moonlight Grand Hotel. They decide to head over there to not only steal the crown, but to also confront Shadow Joker and get Joker's name cleared.
7	7	"The Island of the Evil Scarlet God"; Transliteration: "Shinku no Jashin To" (Japanese: 深紅の邪神島)	November 24, 2014
Blue sea! White clouds! A tropical island! Joker and Hachi are after a gem called the Scarlet Heart, which legends say once belonged to the island's great king. There's an old stone tablet in the village with a riddle that will lead to the treasure.
8	8	"The Diamond and the Queen of Tears, Part 1"; Transliteration: "Diamond to Namida no Queen Zenpen" (Japanese: ダイヤモンドと涙の女王（クイーン） 前編)	December 1, 2014
The treasures Joker goes after are being destroyed one after another. Joker and Hachi are afraid that their next target, the Silver Egg of the Russian Tsar, might be destroyed as well, so decide to try to beat the culprit to the punch.
9	9	"The Diamond and the Queen of Tears, Part 2"; Transliteration: "Diamond to Namida no Queen Kōhen" (Japanese: ダイヤモンドと涙の女王（クイーン） 後編)	December 8, 2014
Oniyama and his team used the fake Silver Egg to fool the thieves while they loaded the real one onto a plane. Queen disguises herself as a passenger to get on board and destroy the Silver Egg. Meanwhile, the injured Silver Heart tells Joker that Queen has mistaken him for the man who killed her parents, and asks him to clear up the misunderstanding.
10	10	"The Luxurious Kaneari Express"; Transliteration: "Kareinaru Ogon Tokkyū" (Japanese: 華麗なる黄金特急)	December 15, 2014
Joker and Hachi infiltrate Kaneari's private Golden Express that is meant to transport a historical family treasure over to the Kaneari Museum in Paris. However, stealing the treasure won't be an easy task since Kaneari and Oniyama do everything they can to prevent the thieves from stealing it.
11	11	"The Beast That Howls at the Moon"; Transliteration: "Mangetsu ni Hoeru Kemono" (Japanese: 満月に吠える獣)	December 22, 2014
Taking place in a flashback during Joker, Spade, and Queen's childhood, a mutant dog known as Super Dog #101 was created in a laboratory and escapes along with a mutant lizard who wants to destroy the human race. He gets injured, falls into a river, and later gets saved by Joker, Spade, and Queen while they were fishing. They name the dog "Roko" after its love for corn and are told by it about the lizard's plan. They decide to pursue the lizard in order to save the human race.
12	12	"Crash! The Dark Ninja Army"; Transliteration: "Gekitotsu! Yami no Ninja Gundan" (Japanese: 激突!闇の忍者軍団)	December 29, 2014
Joker and Hachi sneak into the castle of the Koga Ninja to steal the Golden Shachihoko from the roof of their great hall.
13	13	"The Labyrinth of Shadows and Mirrors"; Transliteration: "Kage to Kagami no Labyrinth" (Japanese: 影と鏡の迷宮（ラビリンス）)	January 5, 2015
A series of underground Grecian ruins plays host to the "Treasure of Olympus." Hachi and Roko are forced to charge into the ruins after Spade to keep him from beating them to the treasure.

=== Season 2 (2015) ===
No. overall	No. in season	Title	Original release date
1	14	"The Great Escape From Demon's Heaven"; Transliteration: "Demon's Heaven Kara no Dai Dasshutsu" (Japanese: デモンズヘブンからの大脱出)	April 6, 2015
After Joker turns himself in to the police, he and Hachi get arrested and are sent to the island prison, Demon's Heaven, which is run by an enormous evil man named Jason. Meanwhile, Oniyama is unhappy with Joker being arrested, while his family along with his assistants, Ginko and Momo, are happy about it.
2	15	"The Secret Gourmet Party"; Transliteration: "Himitsu no Gourmet Party" (Japanese: 秘密のグルメパーティー)	April 13, 2015
Queen was out to steal the Rainbow Peacock Egg when she suddenly went incommunicado. Only one egg of its type is laid every 100 years, and it's said to be indescribably delicious, so wealthy gourmets from all around the world seek it out.
3	16	"The World's Luckiest Phantom Thief"; Transliteration: "Sekai de Ichiban Lucky na Kaitō" (Japanese: 世界で一番幸運（ラッキー）な怪盗)	April 20, 2015
Joker and Hachi steal the Birdman Statue of Osiris from the Desert Bandit Gang. After evading their pursuers, they're met by a curious masked Phantom Thief named Lucky Pyramid. Lucky Pyramid can channel misfortunes that befall him into acts of unbelievable luck.
4	17	"Death Game at Moonlight castle" Transliteration: "Gekkō-jo no Death Game" (Japanese: 月光城の死試合（デスゲーム）)	April 27, 2015
Joker's after the King's Sacred Sword, which lies in the Moonlight Castle, said only to appear under the light of a full moon. They say that no one who goes to steal the sword has ever returned alive. On the way, Joker and Hachi run into Roko, and are led into the castle by its steward, Butler.
5	18	"Beneath the Light of Ragnarok"; Transliteration: "Ragnarok no Hikari no Motode" (Japanese: ラグナロクの光の下で)	May 4, 2015
A gem that Silver Heart took from the Saffron Kingdom, the Blue Star, has been stolen. Joker, Hachi, and Roko venture to the Saffron Kingdom to take it back. The Blue Star's thief, General Basil, wants to use it to revive a satellite cannon called "The Light of Ragnarok" which can destroy a whole city in one blast.
6	19	"Crash!! The Idol Stage"; Transliteration: "Gekitotsu!! Idol Stage" (Japanese: 激突!!アイドル・ステージ)	May 11, 2015
Joker's next target is the Three Star Jewels that adorn the trophy given to the winner of the Idol Grand Prix. Joker, Hachi, and Spade form the three-man idol group "JJ Brothers" to participate in the Grand Prix.
7	20	"Traveling Jokers"; Transliteration: "Traveling Jokers" (Japanese: トラベリング・ジョーカーズ)	May 18, 2015
Joker steals an invention called the Sigma Drive, unaware that it's a time machine, and Shadow attacks him to take it by force. The shock caused by his Bloody Rain causes the Sigma Drive to go haywire, sending Joker and Shadow back in time to the Edo Period.
8	21	"Bonds Formed Crossing the Ocean"; Transliteration: "Taikai wo Wataru Kizuna" (Japanese: 大海を渡る絆)	May 25, 2015
Jack and Queen sneak onto a cruise ship to steal a frozen sabertooth tiger, where they meet a slightly cheeky little boy named King. Jack and King have only just met when they already begin to fight.
9	22	"The Burning Inspector and the Wicked Foxes"; Transliteration: "Hono no Keibu to Jaku na Kitsune" (Japanese: 炎の警部と邪悪な狐)	June 1, 2015
The target this week is the water-and-ink hanging scroll "Tiger in the Moonlight" located at the private Jumonji Academy. Haruka – the school's student council president and Oniyama's daughter – boasts that she will capture Joker... but Joker's not the only one after the scroll! A group of thieves known as the Wicked Foxes kidnap Haruka and the painter's daughter Yui. The scroll is their ransom demand.
10	23	"Crash!! The Magic Ninja's Seal!"; Transliteration: "Gekitotsu!!! Mado Ninja no Fuin" (Japanese: 激突!!!魔道忍者の封印)	June 8, 2015
When Hachi goes home to visit his mother for his birthday, Joker comes along, looking for treasures in his ninja mansion. They're met in the ninja village by Hachi's precocious sister Kurumi and hole-digging brother Ichimaru. The sight of Hachi's family causes Joker to remember his own. When Joker removes the lid from a jar Ichimaru digs up, it unleashes a ninja called Yasha-oh, who was sealed there by Hachi's ancestor long ago.
11	24	"Pandora's Key and the Ruined Kingdom"; Transliteration: "Pandora no Kagi to Horobi no Okoku" (Japanese: パンドラの鍵と滅びの王国)	June 15, 2015
Only one magic crystal remains, and it's in the Pandora Ruins. Professor Clover uses the stolen Sigma Drive to create a tornado, which brings Joker and friends 50 years into the past. There in the Pandora Kingdom they meet Secret Agent Clover, who is trying to steal the Pandora Key to further his plans for world domination, and French Secret Agent Silver, who's trying to stop him.
12	25	"Light and Shadow Jokers"; Transliteration: "Hikatokage no Joker" (Japanese: 光と影のジョーカー)	June 22, 2015
With the three magic crystals of the Staff of Kairos assembled, Shadow steals the staff from Professor Clover and sneaks into the facility where Rose, lies. Rose is a witch with the power to control time, as well as Shadow's little sister.
13	26	"The End to the Long Night"; Transliteration: "Nagaki Yoru no Owari" (Japanese: 長き夜の終わり)	June 29, 2015
Joker and his friends, along with Shadow, head for the research facility in the statue of liberty to steal Rose back from Professor Clover. As they approach from the skies, the Professor's flying submarine fires at them.

=== Season 3 (2016) ===
No. overall	No. in season	Title	Original release date
1	27	"A Fallen Star on the Shining Night"; Transliteration: "Hikaru yoru no daraku shita hoshi" (Japanese: 光る夜の堕落した星)	April 4, 2016
The mysterious organization Devil's Fang is unearthing the Crystal Skull Key from an ancient ruin in order to lure out Joker, when a mysterious shadow wreathed in flames emerges from a nearby stone coffin. Joker infiltrates Mr. Kaneari's Golden Museum in order to take the Crystal Skull Key as his 999th treasure, where he meets a boy named Akai Tsubasa, who seems to want to follow Joker around. Can they break through a gauntlet of perilous traps to get the key? And who is Akai Tsubasa, really?
2	28	"Phoenix and a New Companion"; Transliteration: "Fenikkusu to atarashī nakama" (Japanese: フェニックスと新しい仲間)	April 11, 2016
Akai Tsubasa, AKA Phoenix, has stolen the Crystal Skull Key, and is heading to Pharaoh's ancient temple in Egypt to recover the Great God-Beast with it. Joker pursues him to get back the key. But Pharaoh has left a series of terrifying traps in the temple! Can Joker and his gang get their hands on the great God-Beast?
3	29	"The Road to the Tiger's Eyes"; Transliteration: "Tora no me e no michi" (Japanese: 虎の目への道)	April 18, 2016
The Shuffle Sisters are shooting their first movie in Hong Kong, based on a work by Spadon King. Joker and Hachi infiltrate the set hoping to steal the Tiger Eyes, a jewel used in the climax. Joker's plan is to take the leading actor's place to get close to the treasure, but first he needs to disguise himself as part of the crew.
4	30	"Clash!!!! The Bell Rings for Her"; Transliteration: "Shōtotsu! ! ! ! Kanojo no tame no beruringu" (Japanese: 衝突! ! ! ! 彼女のためのベルリング)	April 25, 2016
The World Bridal Grand Prix is being held to determine the world's greatest bride. Joker and Queen dress up as brides to try to steal the prize awarded to the winner, the Big Wedding Bell, but it turns out the real purpose of the grand prix is to find a bride for Mr. Kaneari. Meanwhile, the Devil's Fang sends an assassin to the grand prix to dispose of Joker.
5	31	"The Ship of Lies and the White Devil"; Transliteration: "Uso no fune to shiroi akuma" (Japanese: うその船と白い悪魔)	May 2, 2016
In the Caribbean Sea, while Joker sneaks on board the sunken ship of Captain Black to steal the Star of Thor, Hachi and Hosshi are captured by pirates. Joker tries to rescue them, but he runs into Captain Blue, Captain Black's grandson. And Phoenix has also come after the treasure.
6	32	"The Shadow, the Eye, and the Fakes!"; Transliteration: "Kage, me, soshite nisemono!" (Japanese: 影、目、そして偽物！)	May 9, 2016
Joker, Spade, and Queen are indignant to learn that they have impostors on the loose! They initially suspect Shadow Joker, but he claims to have no knowledge of the incident. Lacking any other choice, the group leaves advance notice that they're going to steal the same treasure the fakes are going after... but just as the fakes are about to reveal their identity, Inspector Oniyama shows up, leading to a chaotic, three-way standoff. Just who are the Fake Jokers?!
7	33	"Countdown Television!"; Transliteration: "Kauntodaun terebi!" (Japanese: カウントダウンテレビ！)	May 16, 2016
DJ Peacock's TV variety program, Countdown Television, receives advance notice that Joker is going to come to steal a treasure, The Scorpion's Cup, live on the air. To help catch Joker, Peacock brings on the genius high school detective, Hayami Kyotaro. But when Joker is struck with a fatal poison planted in the treasure's display case, he has only thirty minutes to live! Will Joker give up on the treasure? And who will triumph in the battle between detective and phantom thief?!
8	34	"The Genie's Lamp and the Palace of Prophecy"; Transliteration: "Jinī no ranpu to yogen no kyūden" (Japanese: ジニーのランプと預言の宮殿)	May 23, 2016
Joker sends advance notice to Aladdin's kingdom that he's going to steal the Genie's Lamp, which has a connection to the ancient treasure. The king, fearing Joker will interrupt the once-in-a-millennium festival of the genie, employs the prophesying detective Ali Baba and his 40 detectives, who seem capable of predicting Joker's every move. Akai Tsubasa is after the treasure, as well... but the king believes in a legend that he can gain eternal life by stealing Phoenix's heart!
9	35	"A Hero's Qualifications"; Transliteration: "Hīrō no shikaku" (Japanese: ヒーローの資格)	May 30, 2016
To steal the Gold Coin of El Dorado, Joker and Hachi go to New York disguised as patrons of the American Federal Bank. Spider Ace of the Devil's Fang has come to the bank to take out Joker, but he ends up getting confused for a bank robber. Left with no other choice, he takes hostages and barricades himself in. When the police surround the building, he fires off a bazooka to disperse them. Diving in to save them is Rainbow Justice, a self-proclaimed superhero!
10	36	"The Sky Joker in Peril!"; Transliteration: "Kiken ni sarasa rete iru sukaijōkā!" (Japanese: 危険にさらされているスカイジョーカー！)	June 6, 2016
Joker is on cloud nine after finally acquiring his latest treasure, the Thunder Snake. But on his way to his next destination, he runs into a hurricane that shuts off the power in the ship! Already running late, he then finds that Spade and Queen have come aboard to get out of the storm, and they start causing havoc, too... which is only made worse when the ship's rocking sends the Thunder Snake into one of the vents!
11	37	"Requiem for the Masks"; Transliteration: "Masuku no rekuiemu" (Japanese: マスクのレクイエム)	June 13, 2016
Joker and Hachi have traveled down the canals of Venice to steal the Golden Lion Statue, but they're blocked by Nightmare, Italy's #1 phantom thief, who has been dispatched by President D. Nightmare uses masks to turn the townspeople into zombies, and guides them with the sound of a mysterious bell to try to catch Joker. Joker and the art detective Viridian -- who came by to catch Joker -- try to run, but Nightmare seems about to affix one of his masks to Joker himself.
12	38	"Decisive Battle! Phantom Thief Survival Game Part 1!"; Transliteration: "Kessen! Fantomu dorobō sabaibarugēmu dai 1-bu!" (Japanese: 決戦！ファントム泥棒サバイバルゲーム第1部！)	June 20, 2016
Joker is overjoyed to get a vacation invitation from Silver Heart, but it turns out to be an invitation to the Phantom Thief Survival Game, which is held once every four years to determine the number one Phantom Thief! Joker's not enthusiastic about the idea, until he sees how excited Hosshi is over the grand prize, the Gaia Bird. Could the Gaia Bird be related to the ancient secret treasure? Joker suddenly decides he wants it... But can he beat a gathering of phantom thieves from all over the world to get it?!
13	39	"Decisive Battle! Phantom Thief Survival Game Part 2!"; Transliteration: "Kessen! Fantomu dorobō sabaibarugēmu dai 2-bu!" (Japanese: 決戦！ファントム泥棒サバイバルゲーム第2部！)	June 27, 2016
Akai Tsubasa appears, propelling the Phantom Thief Survival Game into its endgame! The Devil's Fang assassin, Mini-Mini King, has used his power to shrink Joker, Hachi, Spade, Queen, Roko, and Shadow. Attacks won't work on him, and it's hard to run away. What trick can Joker use to escape from this desperate situation?! And what is the true identity of Phoenix, finally revealed?!

=== Season 4 (2016) ===
No. overall	No. in season	Title	Original release date
1	40	"The Shining Night and the Messenger of the Southern Cross!"; Transliteration: "Shainingunaito to sazankurosu no messenjā!" (Japanese: シャイニングナイトとサザンクロスのメッセンジャー！)	October 3, 2016
Having run out of clues about the location of the Ancient Treasure, Joker is at a loss. Just then, he happens to see a news broadcast about a gemstone called the Red Comet which is at a lab in Russia. Hosshi's excitement at seeing the jewel spurs Joker to head for the lab at once. Akai Tsubasa is heading for the same lab... but when they get there, they're met by the alien-obsessed mad scientist, Dr. Neo!
2	41	"The Sand Demon and the Masked King"; Transliteration: "Suna no akuma to kamen o kizanda ō" (Japanese: 砂の悪魔と仮面を刻んだ王)	October 10, 2016
Joker and Hachi are in the desert looking for more clues about the ancient treasure. They happen to run into Queen, who is looking for a treasure called the Pharaoh's Mask. It turns out this is a royal desert controlled by the pharaoh, who has used magic to transfer his soul into the iron mask and take over the body of any who wear it! What's more, he's decided to make Queen his new host! Can Joker save Queen and find a new clue to the location of the Ancient Treasure?
3	42	"The Boy With the Eyes of God"; Transliteration: "Kami no me o motsu shōnen" (Japanese: 神の目を持つ少年)	October 17, 2016
Joker and Hachi are in India searching for the Statue of Garuda to get a new clue to the Ancient Treasure. In the temple that houses it they meet a boy named Chappa, who is worshipped for having the "Eyes of God," and performs many miracles for the villagers. Joker and Hachi disguise themselves in order to get closer to the treasure, but Chappa easily sees through them. To save the captured Hachi, Joker finds an offbeat way to challenge Chappa.
4	43	"Inseverable Dreams and Promises"; Transliteration: "Fukakaina yume to yakusoku" (Japanese: 不可解な夢と約束)	October 24, 2016
Joker and Hachi come to hang out with Spade on his airship, where they find a picture from a young idol's concert. Incredibly, it turns out to be a picture of Pretty Ai, Dark Eye as a child. Back when Joker and Spade were just apprentice phantom thieves, they infiltrated an idol concert venue to steal a treasure and met Ai there. But the three are chased by the phantom thief Pumpkinhead, who is also after the treasure! They then try to work together to get rid of Pumpkinhead.
5	44	"Heart-Pounding Panic in a Hot Spring! Clash!!!! The Arrow of Terror Aimed at Joker and the Mystery of the Reverse Perspective Steam Trick and it's too freaking long!" Transliteration: "Onsen de kokoro o furuwaseru panikku! Shōtotsu! ! ! ! Kyōfu no ya wa jōkā to gyaku no ochikochi-hō no nazo o neratta suchīmu torikkudesu!" (Japanese: 温泉で心を震わせるパニック！衝突！！！！恐怖の矢はジョーカーと逆の遠近法の謎を狙ったスチーム・トリックです。)	October 31, 2016
Joker and his gang visit the gorgeous Kaneari Hot Spring for some much-needed R&R and plan to steal the Gorgeous Diamond on the way! But life's never easy for a phantom thief, and Inspector Oniyama, Devil's Fang phantom thief Cupid, and even Commando Satsuko get into the mix, creating a four-way free-for-all. When Cupid starts shooing his Love Arrows into the mix, things get even more wild.
6	45	"The Firebird and the Urn of Life"; Transliteration: "Faiabādo to jinsei no uchū" (Japanese: ファイアバードと人生の宇宙)	November 7, 2016
Joker and Hachi come to the Koga Village to find the Urn of Life, the secret of Himiko's immortality, which may contain a clue to the Ancient Treasure. The village elder tasks Hyakimaru to stand guard over the urn, but he's attacked by the robot army of Dr. Neo, who has come looking for clues to Phoenix's whereabouts. Joker, Hachi, and Hyakimaru must work together to take back the urn!
7	46	"Go After the International Conference!"; Transliteration: "Kokusai kaigi no nochi ni iku!" (Japanese: 国際会議の後に行く！)	November 14, 2016
Silver Heart infiltrated the International Space Conference, attended by VIPs from all over the world, to steal the Amethist Globe, but failed, and issued a cry for help to Joker and Spade. His students have no choice but to come searching for their master, but to do it, they'll have to outwit Inspector Oniyama and the conference's strict security! At the same time, President D and Doctor Neo are also attending the conference to fundraise for missile development.
8	47	"Welcome to the Dark of Darkness!"; Transliteration: "Kurayami no yami e yōkoso!" (Japanese: 暗闇の闇へようこそ！)	November 21, 2016
Shadow Joker issues a phantom thief challenge to Joker! Unfortunately, Joker has caught a cold and can't really compete... but to keep Shadow from mocking him, he sends a remote controlled mini-Joker doll along with Hachi to take his place. Shadow is disappointed, but along with Rose, tries to go through with the competition anyway. The treasure they're after is the Jeweled Crocodile in the Kaneari Mansion, which is also the same place where Hachi and Joker first met!
9	48	"The Vow of Love and Death"; Transliteration: "Ai to shi no chikai" (Japanese: 愛と死の誓い)	November 28, 2016
Joker and Hachi head for an island in the south seas to search for a clue to the Ancient Treasure, but the island turns out to be controlled by a clan of amazons who forbid the presence of men. After Hachi saves their leader, Tiger Mary, from a sticky situation, she immediately falls in love with him! When Hachi tries to run away from her, she traps him in the Vow of Love and Death, a jewel that can suck in anyone who responds to their name being called, and gets ready to force him to marry her!
10	49	"Bonds Lost on the Ocean!"; Transliteration: "Bonzu wa umi de ushinawareta!" (Japanese: ボンズは海で失われた！)	December 5, 2016
Exploiting a moment of weakness, the Devil's Fang, led by President D, has hacked the Sky Joker and stolen it out from under Joker's nose. President D then takes charge of the Frozen Sabertooth Tiger Mummy, a treasure Joker and his friends stole when they were still apprentice phantom thieves. Meanwhile, Red Scorpion disguises himself as Silver Heart and manages to kidnap Queen. President D sends a letter of challenge to Joker and Spade.
11	50	"Clash! The Devil's Fang!"; Transliteration: "Shōtotsu! Akuma no kiba!" (Japanese: 衝突！悪魔の牙！)	December 12, 2016
The Devil's Fang are celebrating the apparent death of the meddling phantom thieves. Dr. Neo is just declaring that it's time to capture Phoenix, when President D, the celebration's one unhappy participant, receives advance notices from Joker, Spade, and Queen about stealing the Frozen Sabertooth Tiger Mummy. The final battle between the phantom thieves and the Devil's Fang is about to commence!
12	51	"The Night That Lost Its Shine"; Transliteration: "Sono kagayaki o ushinatta yoru" (Japanese: その輝きを失った夜)	December 19, 2016
After the fierce battle with Devil's Fang, Joker has recovered the Sky Joker and the Frozen Sabertooth Tiger Mummy. But now, Doctor Neo has grounded and kidnapped Phoenix! Upon learning from Silver Heart and his old friend Agent Purple that Dr. Neo leads a criminal organization known as Jackal, Joker and his team decide to work together to rescue Phoenix from Jackal's island base. But Dr. Neo has a terrible trap lying in wait.
13	52	"Welcome to the Shining Night!"; Transliteration: "Kagayakuyoru e yōkoso!" (Japanese: 輝く夜へようこそ！)	December 26, 2016
As the comet approaches Earth, the countries of the world, fearing an impact, ready their missiles to fire back. But the comet is actually the spaceship that Phoenix and Hosshi came to Earth on, launched into orbit after Phoenix and Hosshi ejected. In order to get Joker his 1000th treasure and send Phoenix back home, they must prevent the missile launch. Can Joker and his friends save the spaceship?
