= World Ice Art Championships =

Ice sculpting contest in Alaska

Coordinates: 64°50′51″N 147°48′22″W

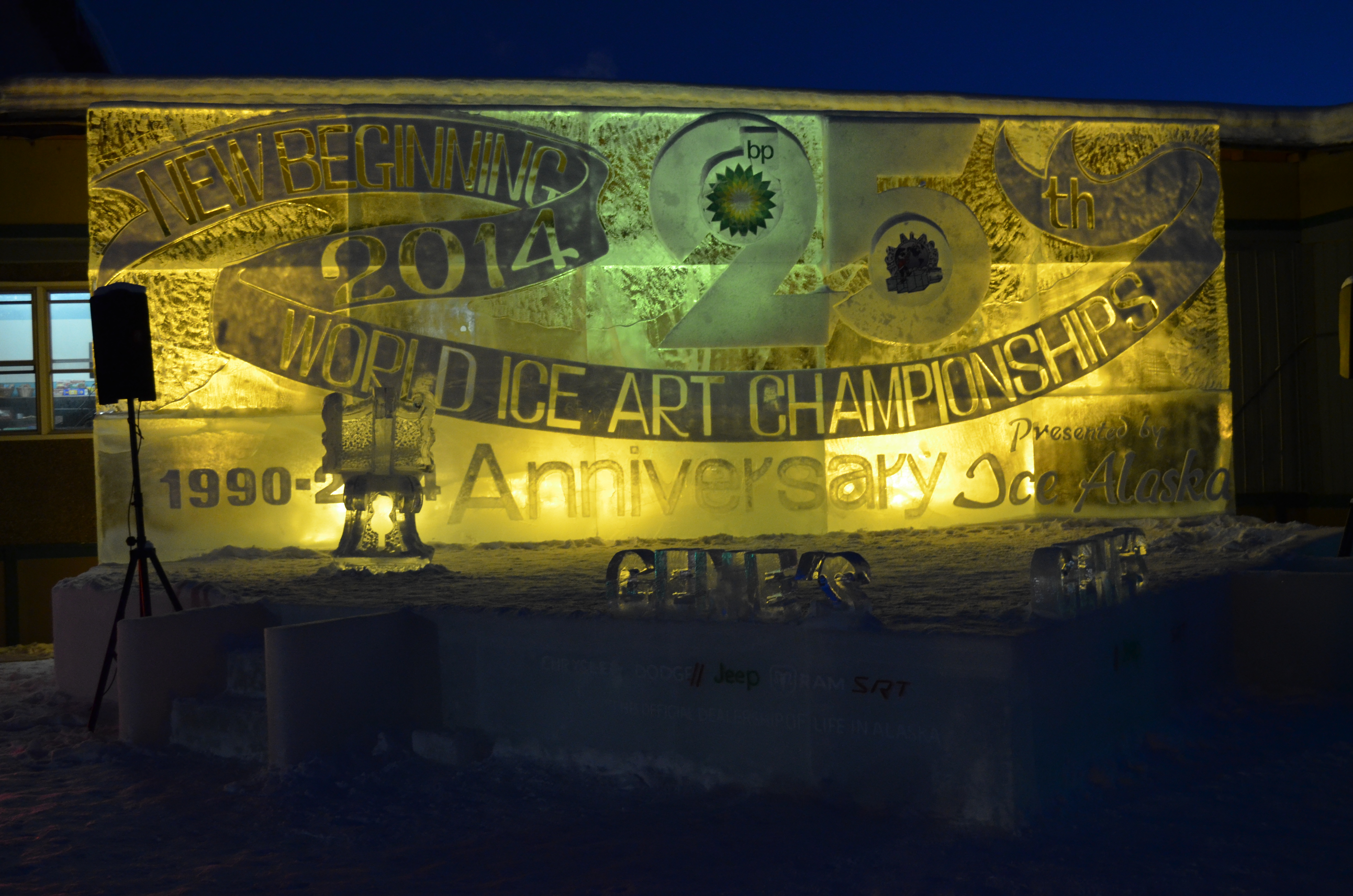
25th World Ice Art Championship banner.

The World Ice Art Championships is an ice sculpting contest in Fairbanks, Alaska produced on by Ice Alaska, a non-profit corporation started in 1989. The contest is the largest of its kind in the world and attended by more than 100 sculptors from 30 countries every year. The contest also draws tens of thousands of spectators; in 2004, 48,000 people from more than 28 countries passed through the park's gates.

== History ==
A multi-block sculpture.

Ice Alaska put on its first ice art championship in 1991; it featured 16 sculpting teams and lasted a week. Today the event begins mid February and, weather permitting, lasts until the end of March, featuring the art and skill of as many as 75 teams from around the world.

Locations: Through 2011, the ice festival took place on a 20-acre (8.1 ha) site across the Chena River from Pioneer Park, which the organizers leased from the Alaska Railroad. In 2012 the event moved to a new location, the George Horner Ice Art Park. In 2017, after a fire destroyed their main lodge, the Ice Alaska organization restructured to protect the future of the event. Then, in 2018 they reached an agreement with the Tanana Valley State Fair Association and moved the World Ice Art Championships, along with the associated Ice Alaska Ice Park, to the Tanana Valley State Fairgrounds.

Ice Alaska has negotiated with a new property owner to harvest ice blocks and transport them to the new venue; the ice is so clear it is referred to as "arctic diamond". In addition to sculptures on view, the event features a Kids Park sculpted out of ice, including ice slides, an ice maze, an ice rink, and spinning cups.

== Events ==
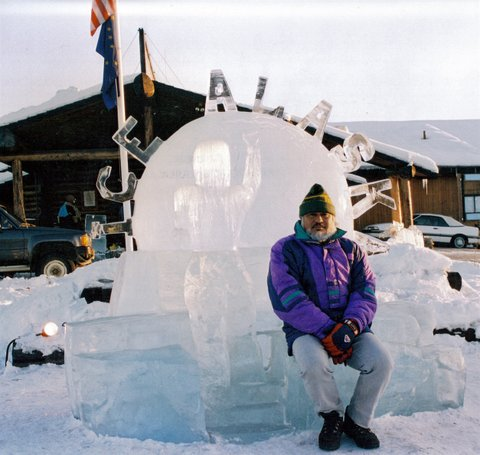
Mexican sculptor Abel Ramírez Águilar with his work at the event

A single block sculpture

The championship is divided into three professional competitions, a youth event, and an amateur exhibition. abstract and realistic categories.

=== Single Block Classic ===
The Single Block Classic is open to 30 contestants. (One Artist and One Block of Ice) Each Artist is provided one block of Ice 6’x4’x3’ (roughly 1,720 lbs) and 48 hours to create a sculpture.

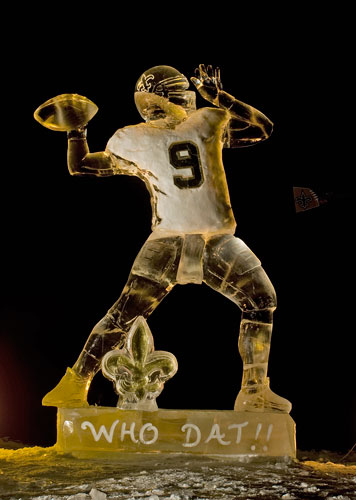
9-foot-tall (2.7 m) ice sculpture depicting New Orleans Saints quarterback Drew Brees & titled "Cool Brees" at the 2010 World Ice Art Championships in Fairbanks, Alaska

=== Double Block Classic ===
The Double Block Classic is open to 25 Teams (2 Artists and 2 Blocks of Ice) Each Team is provided two blocks of Ice 6’x4’x3’ (roughly 3,440 lbs) and 72 hours to create a sculpture.

=== Multi-Block Classic ===
The Multi-Block Classic is open to 15 Teams (4 Artists with 9 Blocks of Ice) Each Team is provided 9 blocks of ice 6’x4’x3’ (roughly 15,490 lbs) and 132 hours to create a sculpture.

=== Youth Classic ===
This competition is held during the week of School Spring Break, usually the second week of March. Is open to ~5 to 15 teams. A Team is defined as 1 or 2 Carvers. Available to students in grades 8th thru 12th 2’ x 3’ x 2-3’ block of ice. The Youth Carvers have an opportunity to be mentored by Master Carvers who volunteer with the event to encourage the next generation of artisans.

== Winners ==
Year	Block	Category	Name	Artists
2010	Single	Realistic	Blue Ring Octopus	(Japan) Junichi Nakamura (United States) Heather Brice
2010	Single	Abstract	Ice Dancing	(Russia) Vitaliy Lednev (Russia) Sergey Loginov
2006	Single	Realistic	Beach Walker	(United States) Steve Brice (Japan) Junichi Nakamura
2006	Single	Abstract	Fiddler	(Russia) Vladimir Zhikhartsev (Russia) Vitaliy Lednev
2006	Multi	Realistic	Balto's Charge	(United States) Steve Berkshire (United States) Mark Johnson (United States) Stanley Kolonko (United States) Carl Eady
2006	Multi	Abstract	Sunrise Over Spring Water	(Russia) Sergei Zaplatin (Russia) Sergey Tselebrovskiy (Russia) Grigoriy Ponomarev (United States) Larry Moen
2005	Single	Realistic	Leap	(United States) Steve Brice (United States) Aaron Costic
2005	Single	Abstract	Fire of Love	(Russia) Vitaliy Lednev (Russia) Vladimir Zhikhartsev
2005	Multi	Realistic	Animal Parade	(United States) Steve Brice (United States) Heather Brown (United States) Tajana Raukar (United States) Mario Amegee
2005	Multi	Abstract	Gateway	(United States) Aaron Costic (United States) Gregory Butauski (United States) Chad Hartson (United States) Jeff Meyers
2004	Single	Realistic	Colorful Duo	(United States) Paul Raukar (United States) Tajana Raukar
2004	Single	Abstract	The Dance	(United States) Jennie Graham (United States) James Stugart
2004	Multi	Realistic	Dragon Boat	(China) Yan Liansheng (China) Zhang Daquan (China) Ma Yue (China) An Quifeng
2004	Multi	Abstract	Michelangelo Hi-Tech-The Creation of Ice Man	(Russia) Vitaliy Lednev (United States) Karen Pless (United States) Chuck Carpenter (United States) Kathleen Carlo-Kendall
2003	Single	Realistic	Graceful Predator	(Japan) Junichi Nakamura (United States) Tajana Raukar
2003	Single	Abstract	White Dance	(Russia) Alexander Zaitsev (United States) Regan Dillon
2003	Multi	Realistic	Friend or Foe	(United States) Steve Brice (United States) Joan Brice (United States) Heather Brown (United States) Tajana Raukar
2003	Multi	Abstract	Seed of Promise	(Czech Republic) Lumir Lang (United States) Ben Firth (United States) Craig Araquistain (United States) Amy Moran
2002	Single	Realistic	King of the Sky	(Japan) Junichi Nakamura (Canada) Hideshi Terada
2002	Single	Abstract	Flame in the Wind	(Russia) Vladimir Zhikhartsev (Russia) Sergey Loguinov
2002	Multi	Realistic	Leap of Faith	(United States) Tajana Raukar (United States) Heather Brown (United States) Wendy Croskrey (United States) Joan Brice
2002	Multi	Abstract	Ice Falls	(Czech Republic) Lumir Lang (United States) Ben Firth (Japan) Tokuji Nakano (United States) Craig Araquistain
2001	Single	Realistic	A Total Lack of Sharing	(United States) Steve Brice (United States) Kevin Roscoe
2001	Single	Abstract	Enlightenment	(Russia) Vladimir Zhikhartsev (Russia) Sergey Loguenov
2001	Multi	Realistic	Pretenders	(United States) Aaron Costic (United States) Steve Brice (Finland) Marja Pohjoisaho (United States) Tajana Raukar
2001	Multi	Abstract	The Unison of Love	(Russia) Sergei Tselebrovski (Russia) Sergei Bannikh (Russia) Sergei Loguenov (Russia) Alexander Zaitsev

== See also ==
- Ice sculpture
- Winter festival
