= Duthain Dealbh =

Duthain Dealbh (meaning Fleeting Sculpture in the Irish language and pronounced du-hawn dah-liv), is a group of artists made up of the three Irish sculptors Daniel Doyle, Niall Magee and Alan Magee, all graduates of Fine Art Sculpture from the Dublin Institute of Technology. Duthain Dealbh was formed officially in 2001 to facilitate the production of large scale sculpture projects and Documentary & film making. They specialize in the ephemeral sculpture materials of Sand, Snow, Ice & Fire, attending sculpture festivals and symposia all over the world and also the production of art based documentaries and films.

The origins of their involvement in this area stemmed from in an invitation to participate in an international Sand Sculpture event which arrived at the university for Fergus Mulvaney, back in 1993. After this introduction more invitations came which allowed the three members of Duthain Dealbh, Magee, Doyle and Magee to be introduced to the various ephemeral media.

Over the last number of years Duthain Dealbh has also branched into Ice sculpting, participating successfully in many competitions and festivals around the world. Their first Film/Documentary Production, "Cool Carvings" was extremely well received and had its first airing on TG4 in 2003, and also received great praise when it was screened at the İzmir International Film Festival in Turkey in 2004.

Two members, Alan Magee and Daniel Doyle, have returned form an international Ice sculpture competition in Jelgava, Latvia where for the second year running they have been awarded First prize. In 2007 their sculpture entitled 'Why are we here?' was a poignant depiction of the humanity between two apposing soldiers in the midst of war.
