= Ice bar =

Ice-based drinking establishment

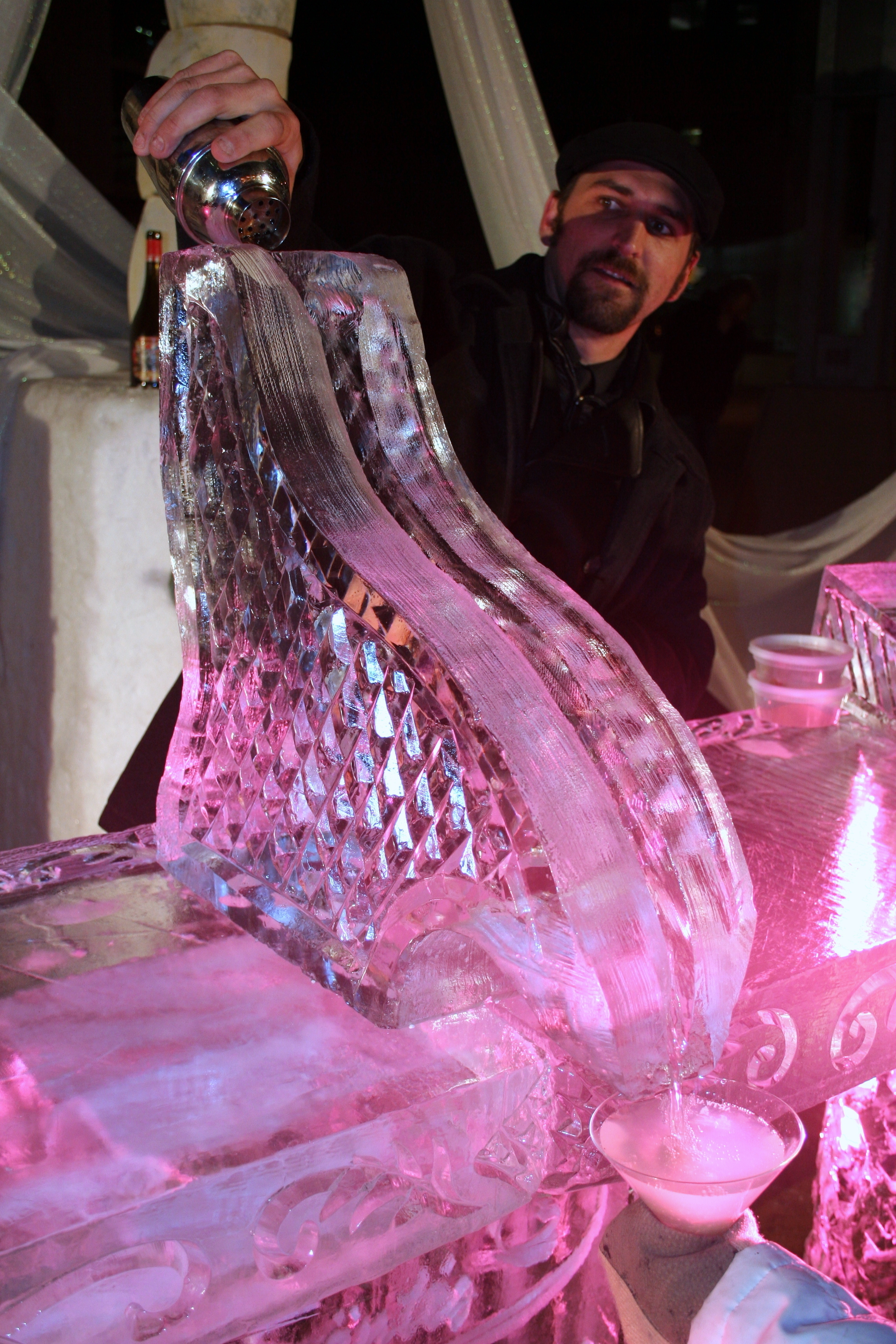
A drink being poured down an ice luge at an ice bar in Rochester, Minnesota

An ice bar, sometimes associated with an ice hotel, is a drinking establishment primarily made of ice. The bars usually contain ice sculptures and other formations and are kept at low temperatures generally about −5 °C (23 °F) to hinder melting. The walls and seating are also usually made of ice. Mostly a novelty, the ice bar is often considered a tourist destination. Visitors enter for timed stays and even staff work on time-limited shifts. The most popular drinks served at ice bars are ice-cold vodka shots, or cocktails mixing vodka with a berry puree.

== Locations ==
The ice bar is usually located in colder regions around the world, as it is easier to keep the ice stable in frigid temperatures. Ice bars originated in Jukkasjärvi, Sweden in 1994. Some ice bars are also located in larger cities all over the world including Honningsvåg, Norway, Barcelona, Monterrey, Mexico City, Montevideo, Panama City, Las Vegas, Nevada, Orlando, Amsterdam, London, New York City, Paris, Rhodes, Lyon and Saint-Tropez, France, Seoul, Hong Kong, Mumbai, Hurghada and Sharm El Sheikh, Egypt, Beirut, Lebanon, Saint Petersburg, New Delhi, Koh Samui, Thailand, Tokyo, Stockholm, Surfers Paradise, Australia, Budapest, Bratislava, Antipolo, Philippines, and Dubai, as the cost of upkeep can be sustained by its many patrons.

Icebar Orlando is the world's largest permanent ice bar, at over 1,200 square feet. It is composed of over 70 tons of carved ice. It is located on International Drive in Orlando, Florida.

== See also ==
- Ice luge
