= Ice luge =

Type of ice sculpture

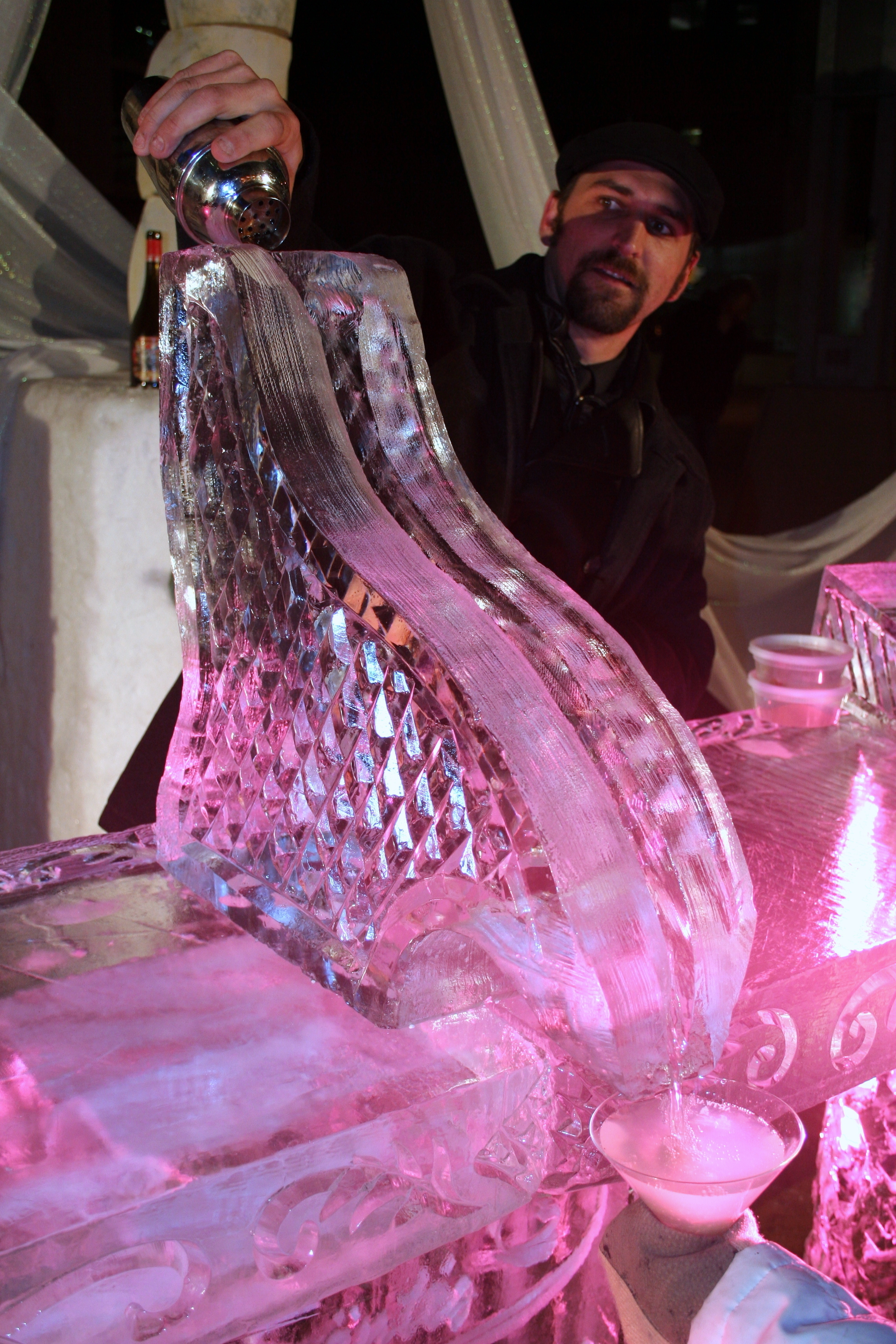
A drink being poured down an ice luge at an ice bar in Rochester, Minnesota

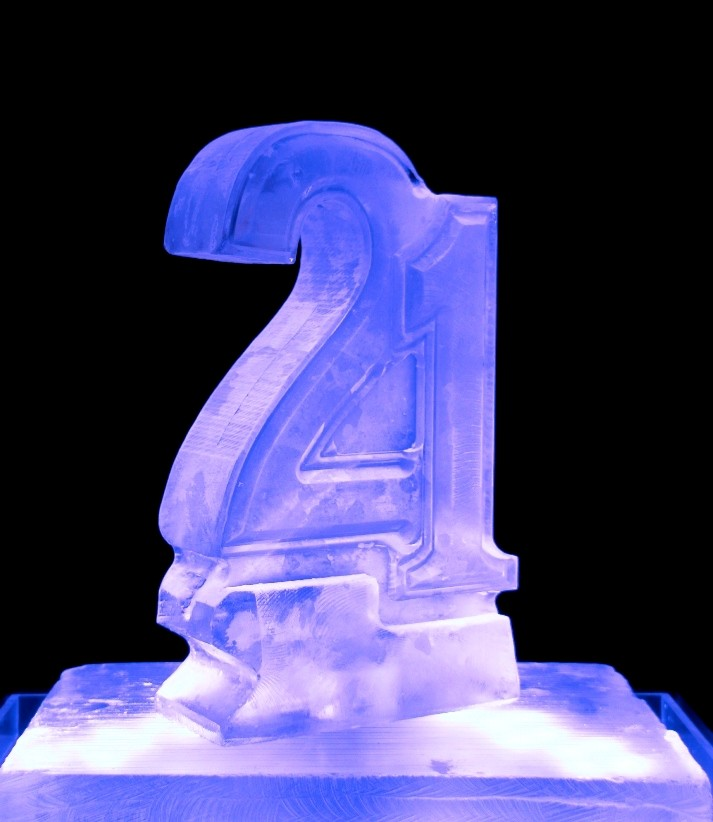
An ice luge formed in the shape of the number 21

An ice luge, martini luge, or shooter-block is a type of ice sculpture made from a large block of ice that has a narrow channel carved through where liquid is poured, such as liquor products. Some are professionally produced from sculpturing or from molds, and some are homemade. Ice luges are sometimes offered in ice bars, and have also been used for serving oysters. Ice luges have also been described as a type of drinking game.

== Etymology ==
The Routledge Dictionary of Modern American Slang and Unconventional English defines Ice luge as "a block of ice used in a drinking game in which a shot of vodka, tequila, or other alcoholic drink is poured down the ice into the drinker's mouth."

== Composition and production ==
An ice luge can be carved from a block of ice or cast from a mold. Some designs incorporate the use of a tube that exists within an ice sculpture. Companies that create ice sculptures may purvey ice luges, and some ice companies also create and sell custom designs. Ice luges can also be homemade, and molds are available to consumers for doing so.

== Uses ==
Typically liquor, such as vodka, is poured into a channel at the top of the luge and dispensed at the bottom of the channel, either into the mouth of a participant or a glass. There is a possibility that vodka may be diluted with water when ice luges are used (along with other beverages). Martinis and champagne are also sometimes chilled and served using ice luges. They are sometimes utilized in ice bars, which are drinking establishments made primarily of ice. Ice luges have also been used for the consumption of oysters.

== Gallery ==
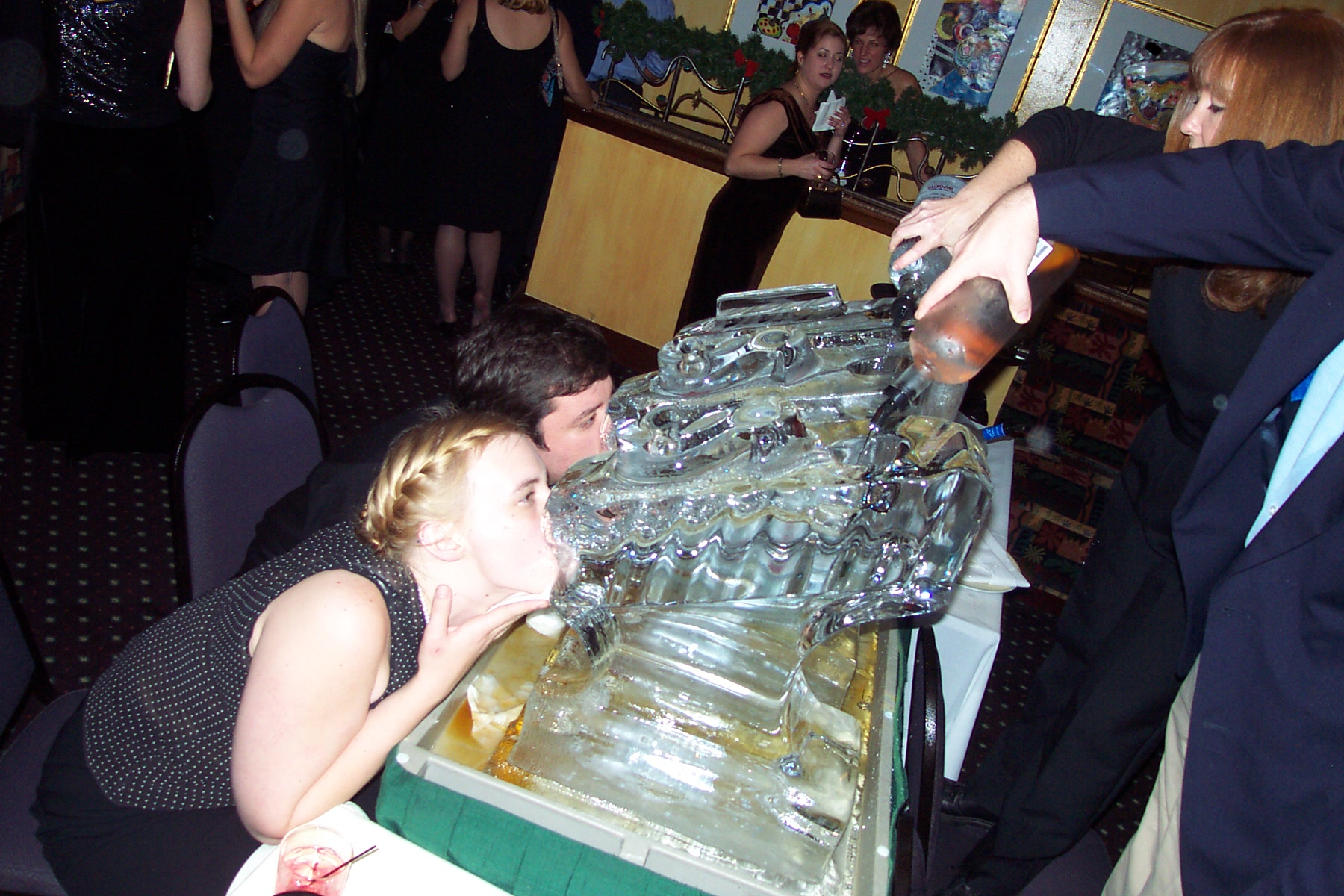
Party goers drinking from ice luges (2003)

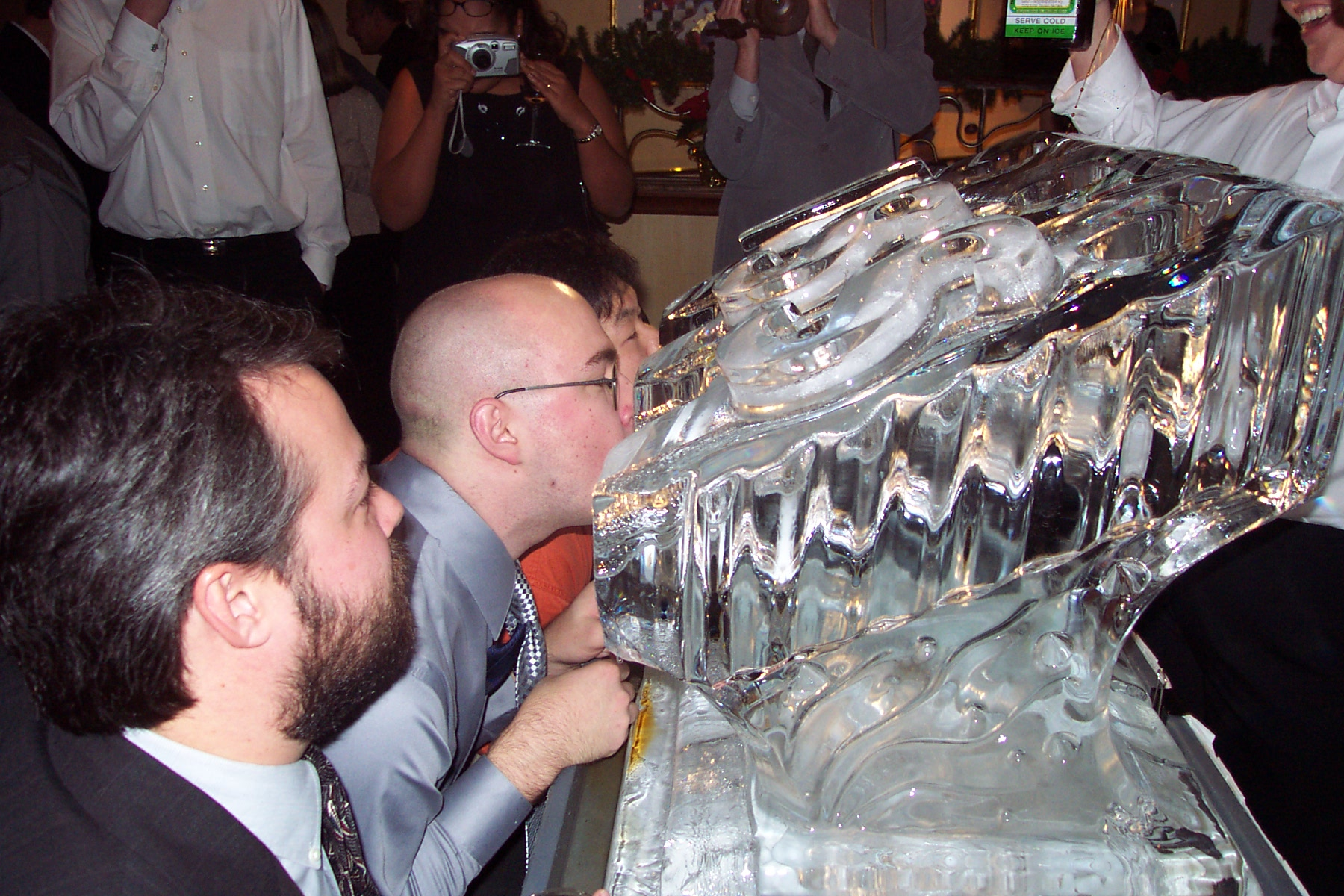
Jägermeister being poured down ice luges (2002)

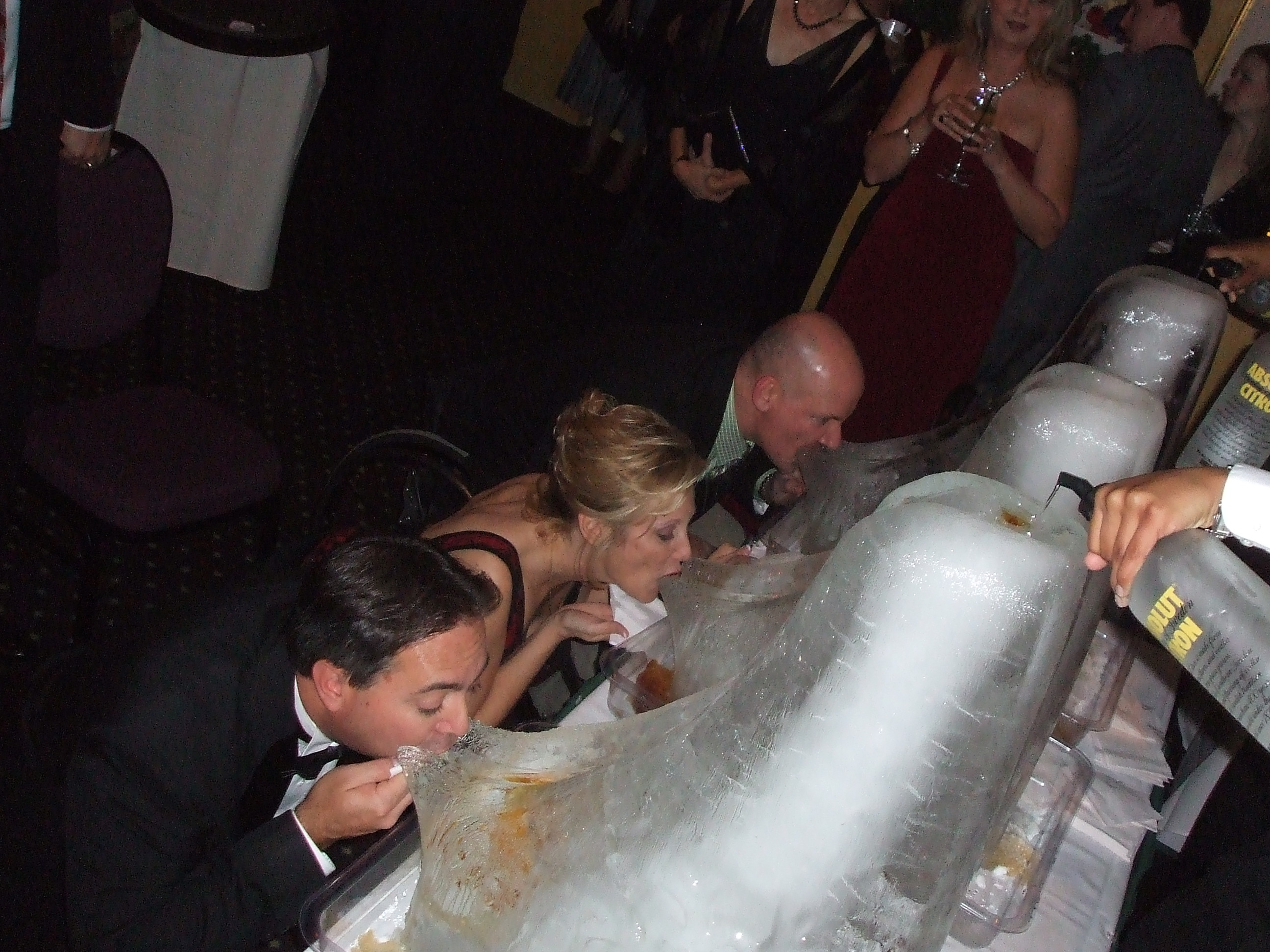
Absolut Vodka being served through ice luges (2006)

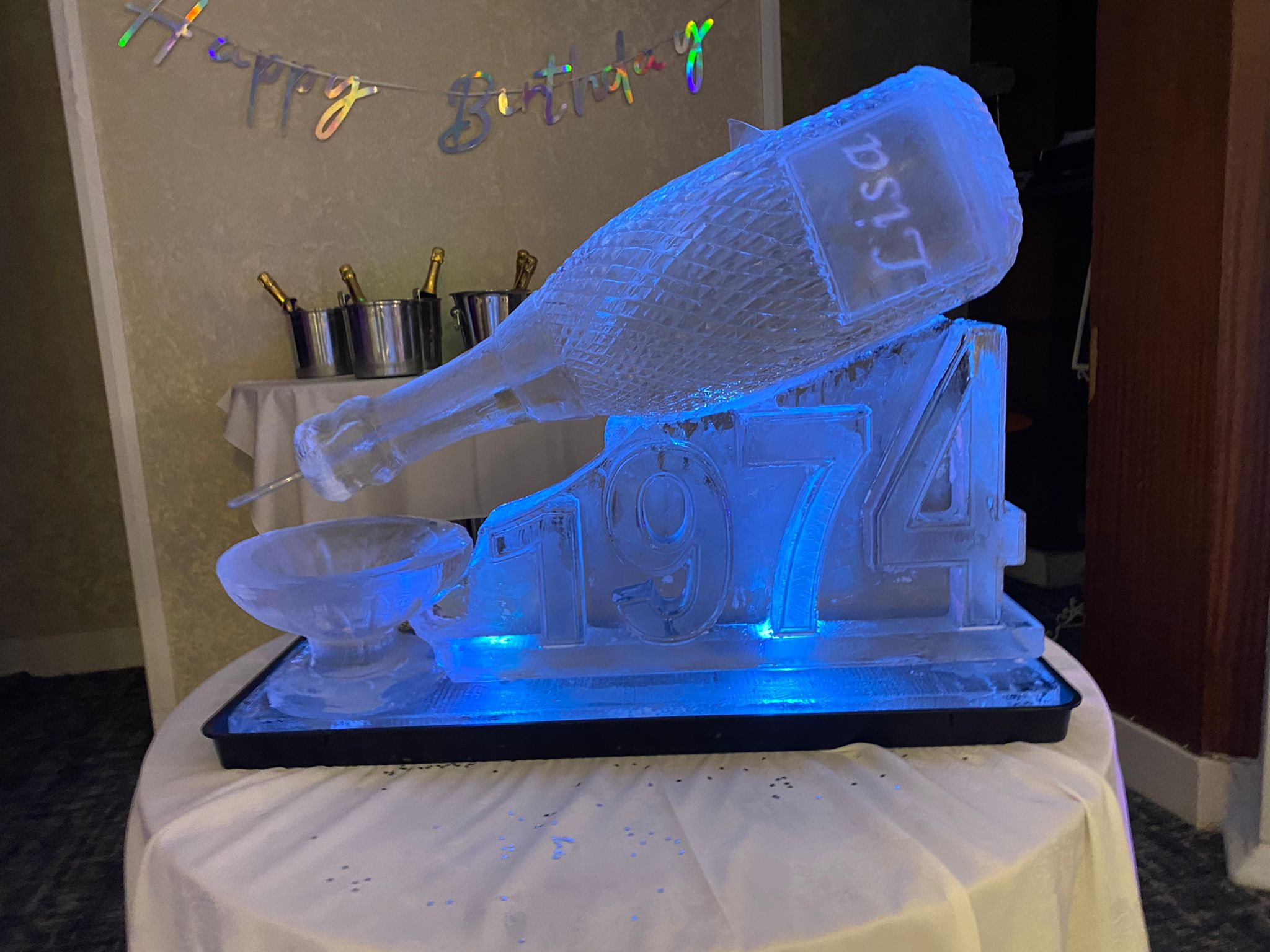
Ice luge sculpture by Techne Ice. [Source](https://techneice.com/party-ice-luges/)

== See also ==
- Drinking culture
- Shooter (mixed drink)
