= Abel Ramírez Águilar =

Mexican sculptor (1943–2021)

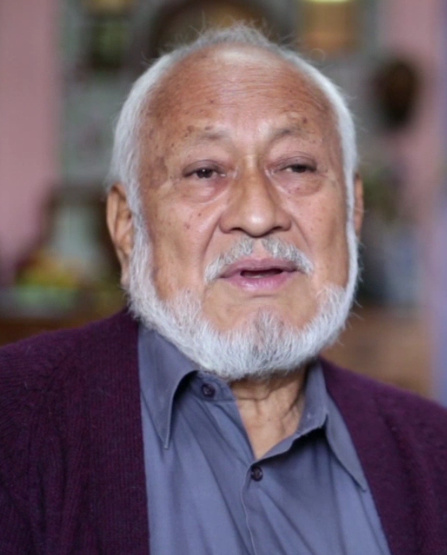
- Born: 22 May 1943; Mexico City, Mexico
- Died: 19 July 2021 (aged 78); Mexico City, Mexico
- Education: Escuela Nacional de Pintura, Escultura y Grabado "La Esmeralda"
- Occupations: Sculptor and painter

Abel Ramírez Águilar (22 May 1943 – 19 July 2021) was a Mexican sculptor who won many prizes not only for traditional pieces in wood, stone and metal, but also for ice and snow sculptures in the United States, Canada, Japan and Europe. He was trained as a sculptor in Mexico and the Netherlands and has exhibited his work individually and collectively since the 1960s. He discovered snow and ice sculpting while visiting Quebec in the 1980s, first experiencing snow in his forties. The challenge intrigued him and he began sculpting this medium as an amateur. He began sculpting ice and snow professionally when he was entered in the competition associated with the 1992 Winter Olympic Games without his knowledge. Having practiced beforehand at an ice factory in Mexico City, he won the gold medal for this event, leading to invitations to other competitions for over twenty years. Ramírez lived in Mexico City.

== Life ==
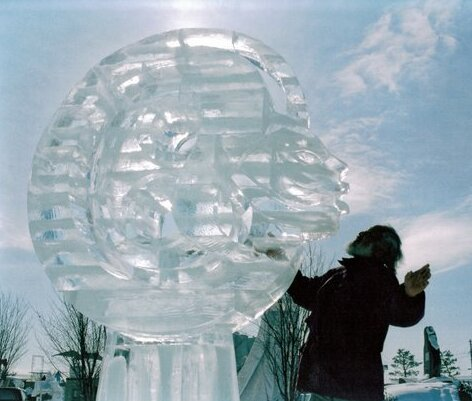
Ramírez Aguilar and sculpture in Japan

Abel Ramírez Aguilar was born in Mexico City on 22 May 1943. His interest in art began early and he credited his childhood arts teachers with valuing his innate talent and forms of expression.

He originally studied architecture instead of fine arts. However, he took classes in sculpting at Escuela Nacional de Pintura, Escultura y Grabado "La Esmeralda" in 1958, 1963, 1967 and 1968 and studied ceramics, enamels and glass at the Escuela Nacional de Diseño y Artesanias in Mexico City from 1958 to 1963. He studied under José Chávez Morado at La Esmeralda. He then received a scholarship to study ceramics at the Rhode Island School of Design under Lylie and Dorothy Perkins in 1962.

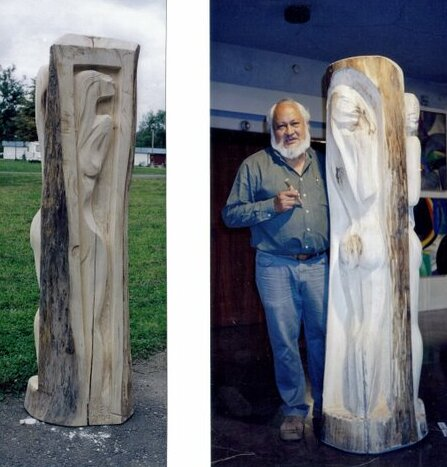
Ramírez with his entry at a sculpture competition in Poland

Ramírez was a trained diver and registered diving instructor as well as the founder of the Federación Mexicana de Actividades Subacuáticas. Ramírez was a pioneer in underwater photography in Mexico at a time when good scuba and underwater photographic equipment was not available in the country, in part due to government restrictions on their import. Nonetheless, Ramírez had a number of exhibitions of this photographic work both in Mexico and abroad. In 1975, he won second place at the Grand Prix of Underwater Photography of the World Underwater Federation in Stockholm, Sweden.

After a number of exhibitions of his drawing and sculpture, he received a scholarship from the Dutch government in 1979 to study for two years at the Royal Academy of Art, The Hague. While in the Netherlands, he was invited to work at the Ingrid Rolema Artistic Foundation at The Hague from 1980 to 1981.

Ramírez had never seen or touched snow until the mid-1980s when he was in his forties visiting friends in Quebec. He found it magical and sensual, and upon finding out that there were sculptors dedicated to creating works in ice and in snow, he wanted to try the new medium. He came to appreciate the culture and made friends with ice and snow sculptors there and participated as an amateur. He later began to sculpt the two media professionally.

He died on 19 July 2021 at age 78 in his hometown Mexico City.

== Career ==
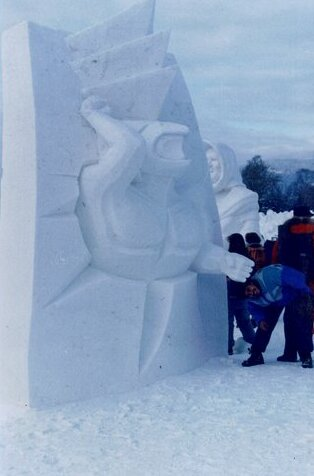
Snow sculpture done at Lillehammer, Norway

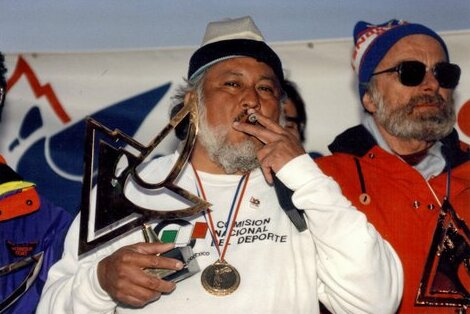
Ramírez Aguilar with awards in France

Ramírez's career consisted of individual and collective exhibitions of his work as well as participation in sculpting competitions both in traditional materials, such as stone, wood and metal; later in his career, he also participated in competitions in snow and ice sculpture. He had participated in these competitions in Sweden, Norway, Finland, France, Canada, the United States, Japan, Colombia, Argentina, Scotland, Poland, Hungary and Bangladesh. In Mexico, he had participated nearly every year in sculpting competitions in the categories of steel, stone and wood such as the Simposio de Escultura Monumental en Acero Inoxidable in Tultepec, State of Mexico, the Festival Internacional de Cantera in Oaxaca and the Concurso Nacional de Escultura en Madera in Mexico City.

From 1965 to 1980, most of his exhibitions were of sculptures and drawings. These included the Galería de la Academia de Bellas Artes in Puebla (1965), Centro Cultural de Villa Olímpica (1970), Galería Fernando Ramírez Osorio in Puebla (1972), Galería Chapultepec in Mexico City (1971, 1972), Galería José María Velasco in Mexico City (1972), the Casa de la Paz in Mexico City (1973), the Universidad Nacional Autónoma de México (1973), Galería Pablo Picasso in Tulancingo (1974), the Casa de Cultura in Querétaro (1975), the Procuraduría General de la República in Mexico City (1976), the Museo de Arte Contemporáneo in Morelia (1977) and the Polyforum Cultural Siqueiros (1978).

Starting in 1980, his exhibitions have specialized in sculptures. These included Pulchri Studio in the Hague, De Dry Coningen Gallery in the Netherlands, and the Gallery of the Art and Folklore of the Countryside in the Hague (1980), Cowall Gallery in the Hague and at the Goudkuil Gallery in Gouda, the Netherlands (1981), Casa de Cultura in Puebla (1983), the Sonora Institute of Technology (1984), Galería Marstelle in Mexico City (1985), retrospective at the Instituto Politécnico Nacional, and exhibitions at UNAM and the Casa de la Cultura in Puebla (1986), Galería Misrachi in Mexico City (1987), Alianza Francesa in Mexico City (1988), ITESM—Campus Estado de México (1991), Casa de Cultura in Acapulco (1999), the gallery of the National Lottery building in Mexico City (2002) and Centro de Convenciones en Cancún (2008).

In 1990, the Museo Universitario del Chopo presented a 25-year retrospective of his work with over 140 sculptures.

He also participated in over 45 collective exhibitions starting in 1967 in Bangladesh, Guatemala, Argentina, the United States, Finland, Canada, the Netherlands, as well as multiple venues in Mexico such as the Museo de Arte Moderno, the Salón de la Plástica Mexicana, Palacio de Bellas Artes and the Polyforum Cultural Siqueiros.

Ramírez gained notability for his participation in ice and snow sculpting competitions for over twenty years. As there is no organization in Mexico for ice and snow sculptors, Ramírez developed his skills through invitations to events by organizers. He was first exposed to ice and snow sculpture in Quebec, became interested in the new medium, and began to sculpt as an amateur. He came to appreciate the culture and made friends with ice and snow sculptors there and participated as an amateur. His first competition was at the competition held in conjunction with the Winter Olympic Games in Valloire/Albertville, France in 1992, where he was registered to compete by his friends without his knowledge. To prepare, he practiced at an ice factory in the historic center of Mexico City. He won the gold medal for his entry and this success led to subsequent invitations to compete.

He participated in the second International Competition of Champions in Ice Sculpture in Breckenridge, Colorado in 1992 and the Winter Games in Lillehammer, Norway in 1994. In 1995, he was captain of the Mexican ice/snow sculpting team and competed at the International Competition of Ice Sculpture in Asahikawa, winning the Chamber of Commerce prize. The team was invited to participate in the International Competition of Arts in Ice and Snow Sculpture in Higashikawa the same year. In 1996, he participated in the Ice Art 96 World Championships winning second place. He participated in the International Snow Sculpture Championships in Breckenridge in 1998 and 1999, winning the gold medal in 1999. In Lulue, Sweden, he won second place and two silver medals in 2000. He represented Mexico at the World Ice Art Championships in 2000, 2001 and 2003 in Alaska. In 2008, he participated in the Winterlude event in Ottawa.

He did not remember how many sculptures he had produced but he figured the number to be in the hundreds. These included a number of monumental works in various cities in Mexico, such as Veracruz, Tejupilco, Ecatepec and Aguascalientes.

For nearly his entire career, he was also a teacher of the arts. He began teaching ceramics at C.E.C.A.T.I. Num. 8 in Puebla from 1963 to 1967. From 1967 to 1969, he was an instructor in metals, ceramic and glass at the Centro de Artes Plásticas y Artesanías of IMSS. Since 1982, he has been a sculpting instructor at Escuela Nacional de Pintura, Escultura y Grabado "La Esmeralda".

In addition to the many prizes Ramírez has won for individual sculptures, he has also received recognitions for his career. In Argentina, the auditorium in the tourist complex of Villa Carlos Paz was named after him in 1998. He was invited to become a member of the Salón de la Plástica Mexicana in 1998, receiving the El Tlacuilo medal in 2001 from the organization for his achievements. He was also a member of the Sociedad Mexicana de Derechos de Author de Artistas Plásticos, and the Asociación de Artistas Plásticos in Mexico. In 2005 he received the Gran Orden de Honor Nacional al Mérito Autoral from the Secretaría de Educación Pública and the International Publishers Association for his life's work.

== Artistry ==
Over his career he had experimented with various materials and techniques, with most of his work in wood, bronze and later snow and ice. His works are generally medium to monumentally-sized. He described his work as "neo-figurative" with elements of Cubist and Impressionist influences. His work has also been described as having a touch of surrealism or magical realism.

A significant amount of his work, especially in snow and ice, shows Mexican nationalism, influenced by Mexico's history, especially its pre Hispanic history. Celestial motifs are common as well. His experience as a ceramicist has contributed to his sculpture, with simplified lines and a sense of fragility. He had also sculptures which feature solitary figures looking through windows and others accompanied by cats, birds, stars and snails. He pioneered the use of chiseled bronze plated in silver. Works of this sort were first exhibited at the Monte Pelvoux Gallery in Lomas de Chapultepec. This work was the result of his experience from working fine metals (gold, silver and copper) in more traditional ways.
