= Ice sculpture =

Form of sculpture using ice as the raw material

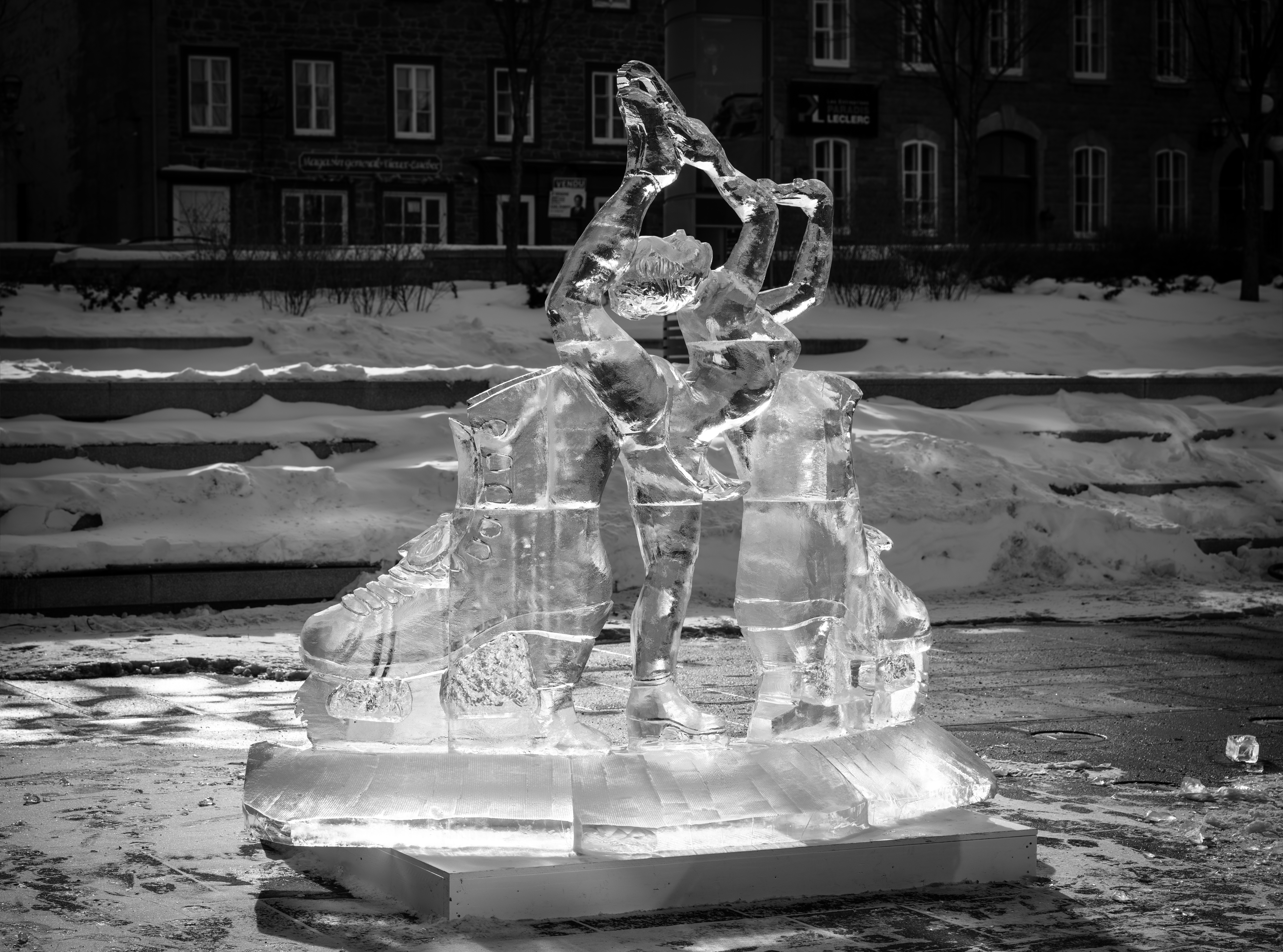
Ice sculpture in Quebec city downtown

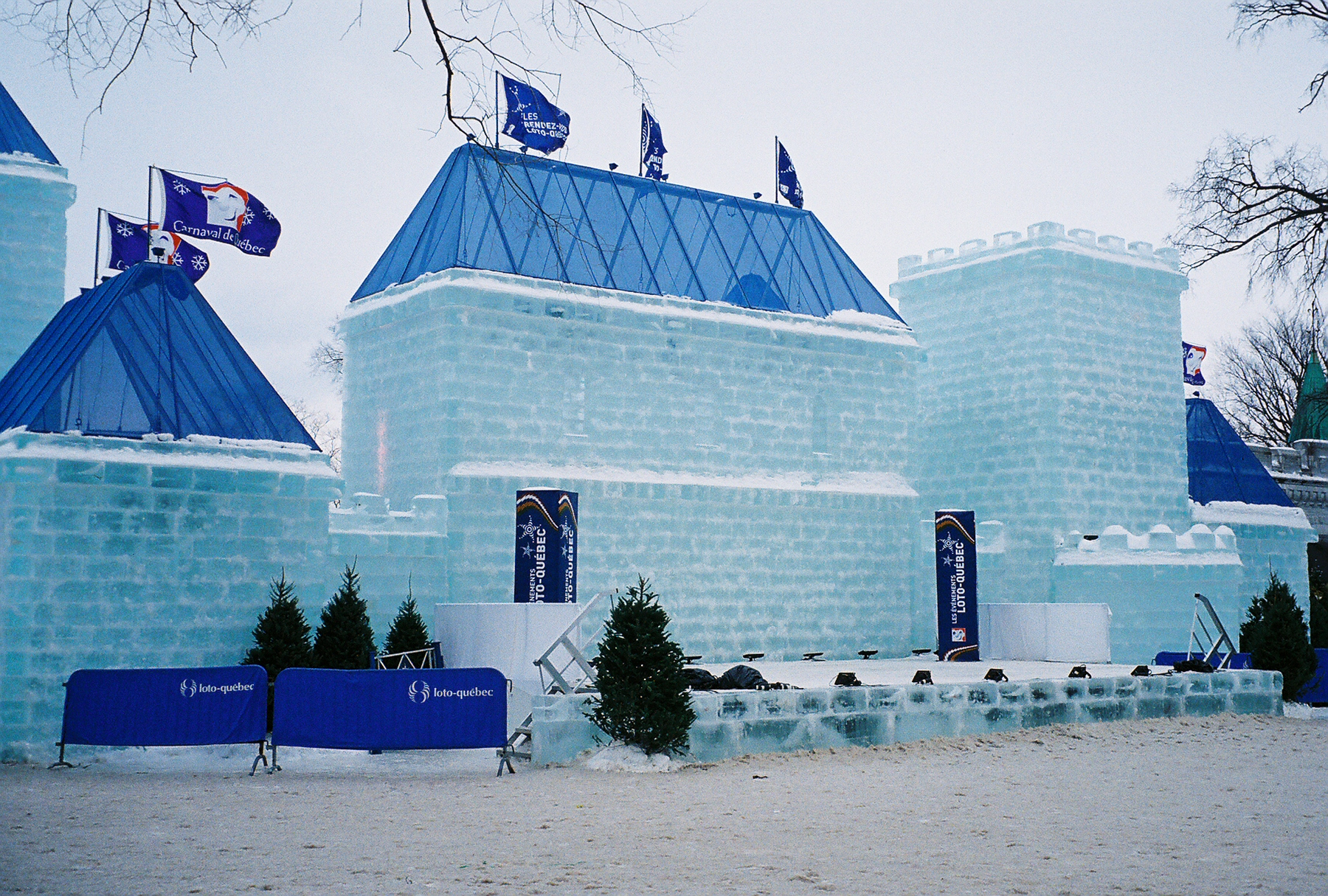
An ice castle during the Quebec Winter Carnival of 2009

Ice sculpture is a form of sculpture that uses ice as the raw material. Sculptures from ice can be abstract or realistic and can be functional or purely decorative. Ice sculptures are generally associated with special or extravagant events because of their limited lifetime.

The lifetime of a sculpture is determined primarily by the temperature of its environment, thus a sculpture can last from mere minutes to possibly months. There are several ice festivals held around the world, hosting competitions of ice sculpture carving.

== Raw material ==
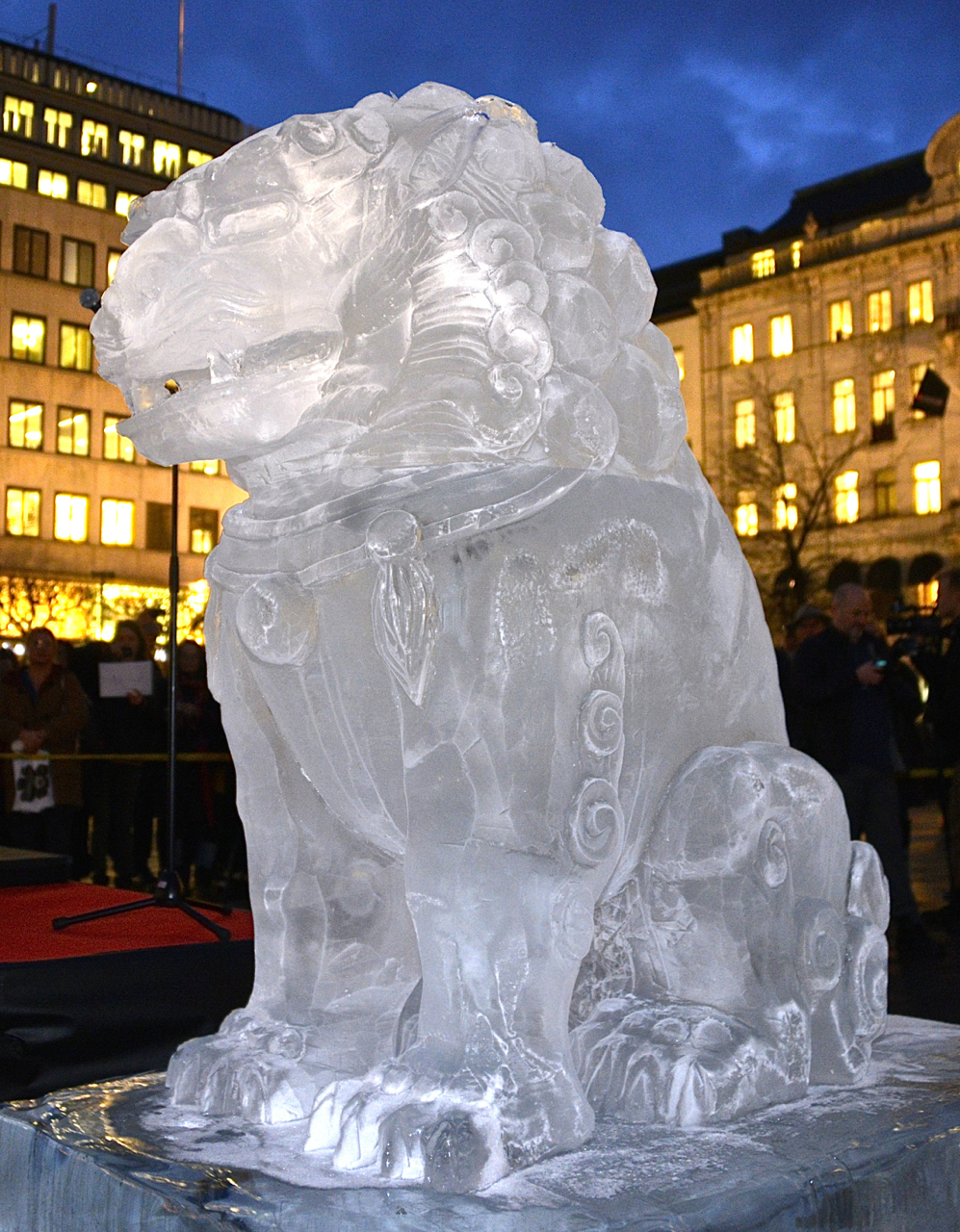
Ai Weiwei ice sculptures in Stockholm, 2014

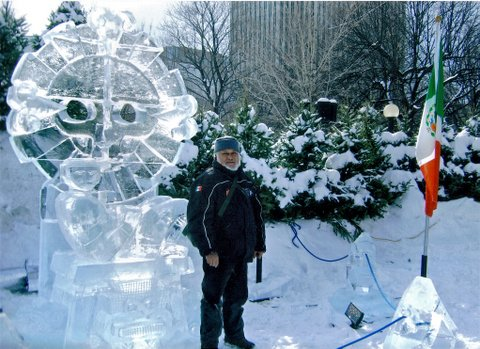
Mexican sculptor Abel Ramírez Águilar and a Chac Mool ice sculpture

Sculpting ice presents a number of difficulties due to the variability and volatility of the material. Ice may be sculpted in a wide range of temperatures and the characteristics of the ice will change according to its temperature as well as the surrounding temperatures. Sculptures are generally carved from blocks of ice and these blocks must be carefully selected to be suitable for the sculptor's purposes and should be free of undesired impurities. Typically, ideal carving ice is made from pure, clean water. However, clear, transparent ice is a result of the freezing process and not necessarily related to the purity of the water. Clouded ice is often the result of finely trapped air molecules that tend to bind to the impurities while naturally freezing. Mechanically clear ice is usually made as the result of controlling the freezing process by the circulation of the water in the freezing chamber. This process hopes to eliminate any trapped air from binding to the impurities in the freezing process. Certain machines and processes allow for slow freezing and the removal of impurities and therefore are able to produce the clear blocks of ice that are favored by ice carvers. However, not all blocks that are carved are clear ice. White ice blocks look like snow and are sometimes carved. Colored ice blocks are produced by adding dyes to the ice and can be carved as well. In some instances, clear ice and colored ice are combined to create a desired effect.

There are various sizes of ice blocks that are produced artificially. Naturally made blocks can be cut to almost any size from frozen rivers or from "ice quarries", which are essentially lakes or ponds that have frozen over. Large ice blocks must be moved by heavy machinery and are used for large ice sculpting events or as part of an ice hotel.

== Techniques ==
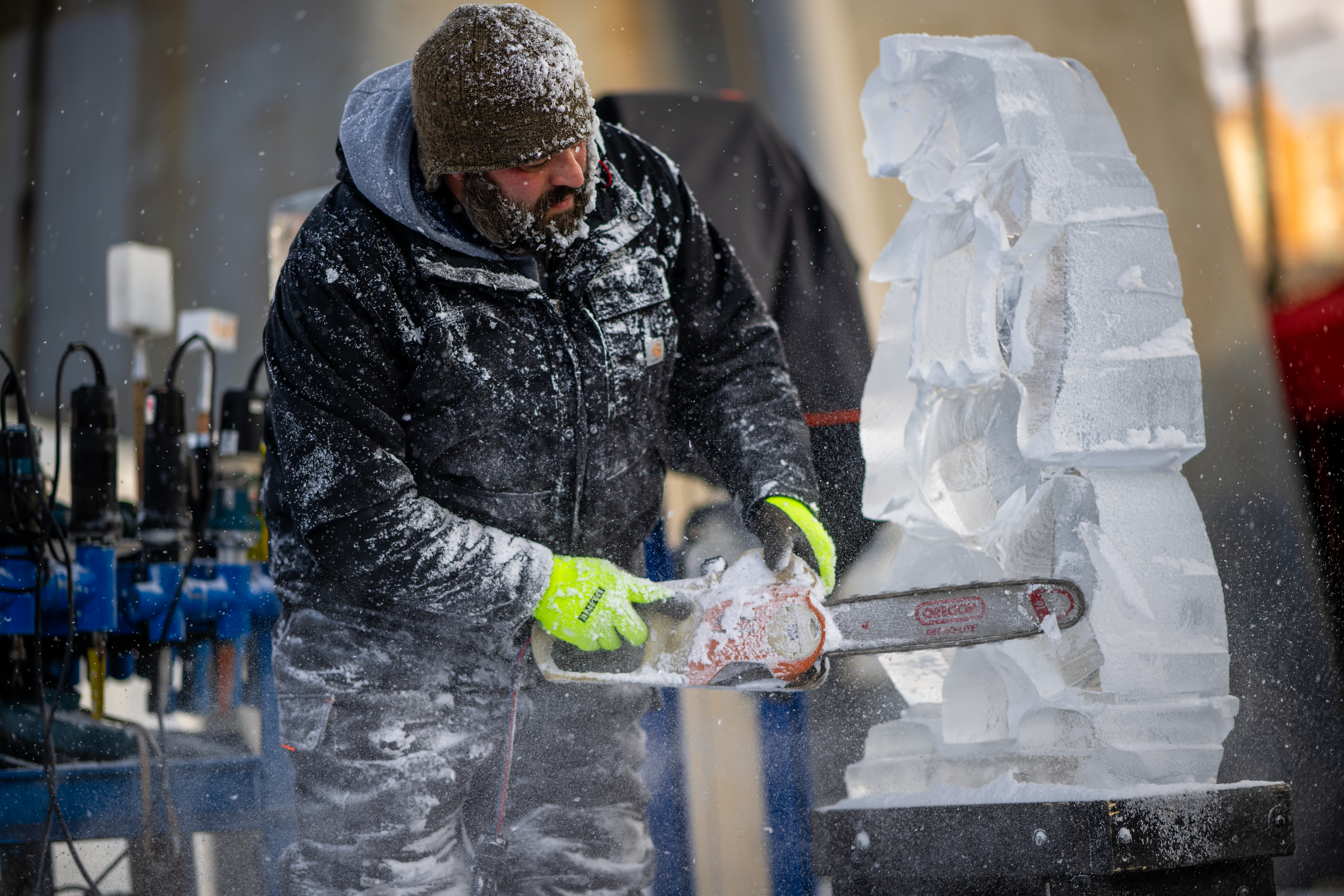
A sculptor carving a sculpture using a chainsaw in Cleveland in February 2022

The temperature of the environment affects how quickly the piece must be completed to avoid the effects of melting; if the sculpting does not take place in a cold environment, then the sculptor must work quickly to finish the piece. Some sculptures can be completed in as little as ten minutes if the carver is using power tools such as chainsaws and specialty bits fitted to a die grinder.

Ice sculptors also use razor-sharp chisels and hand saws that are specifically designed for cutting ice.

As various technologies are adapted for use with ice carving, many sculptures are now created largely by machine. CNC machines and molding systems are now commonly used to create ice sculptures and complicated logos from ice. Color effects are also possible by a number of techniques, including the addition of colored gels or sand to the ice.

This art form is traditionally taught in culinary schools using text books such as Ice Sculpting the Modern Way, Joseph Amendola's Ice Carving Made Easy and Mac Winker's Ice Sculpture: The Art of Ice Carving in 12 Systematic Steps. There are also small schools that teach ice carving. This includes the ability to become a Certified Ice Carver.

The ice may be turned clear after carving by applying heat from a Propane or Mapp Gas cylinder. This alters the opaque effect that is obtained when carving. The ice turns clear after the outside is melted. Caution is to be used as the ice melts very quickly and could soften edges and contours. Sometimes distilled water is used for enhanced clarity.

== Uses ==
Ice sculptures feature decoratively in some cuisines and may be used to enhance the presentation of foods, especially cold foods such as seafood or sorbets. The story of the creation of the dish Peach Melba recounts that Chef Auguste Escoffier used an ice swan to present the dish. At holiday buffets and Sunday brunches some large restaurants and hotels will use ice sculptures to decorate the buffet tables. Cruise ship buffets are also famous for their use of ice sculptures.

Ice sculptures are often used at wedding receptions, usually as some form of decoration. Popular subjects for ice sculptures at weddings are hearts, doves, and swans. Swans have a reputation for monogamy, partly accounting for their popularity.

Ice sculptures may be used at a bar, in the form of an ice luge, or even the entire bar may be made of ice.

Ice sculptures with high surface area like in a radiator can be used to cool air to blow on people during heat wave events when air conditioning is not available.

Ice sculptures, ice walls for fire fighting, property protection and cooling stations may be cast by a process in which ice water (one part), crushed ice or ice cubes (three parts) and tiny, floating, dry ice pellets (one part) are placed in a cement mixer. The tiny dry ice pellets super cool the ice water so that the ice water acts like glue to cement or freeze the crushed ice or ice cubes together within several seconds once the mixture stops moving within the mold. The ice water component of the mixture will expand 9% on freezing, so rubber, foam or foam lined casting materials work best to combat the water to ice expansion problem not encountered with wax, cement, casting plaster or metal casting materials.

Ice sculpture or ice walls may be stopped from melting by placing and keeping vertical voids in the ice sculpture or ice wall filled with the same type of tiny dry ice pellets used to make ice walls by the Icecrete process previously called Cryocrete in a 2014 U.S. provisional patent.

== Around the world ==
There are a number of international ice and snow sculpting events around the world. The largest events are, understandably, held in countries with cold winters. Due to land distribution and population densities in the higher latitudes, large ice sculpture events are almost exclusively held in the Northern Hemisphere. A number of countries, some listed below, have established traditions of ice sculpting and have made contributions to the art. Ice artists from these countries regularly appear at international ice sculpture events.

=== Belgium ===
Ice sculptures were displayed at the Ice Sculpture Festival on November 28, 2010 in Brugge, Belgium. More than 300,000 kilograms of ice are shipped in for sculptors to work on in the special tents and it runs until January 16, 2011.

=== Canada ===
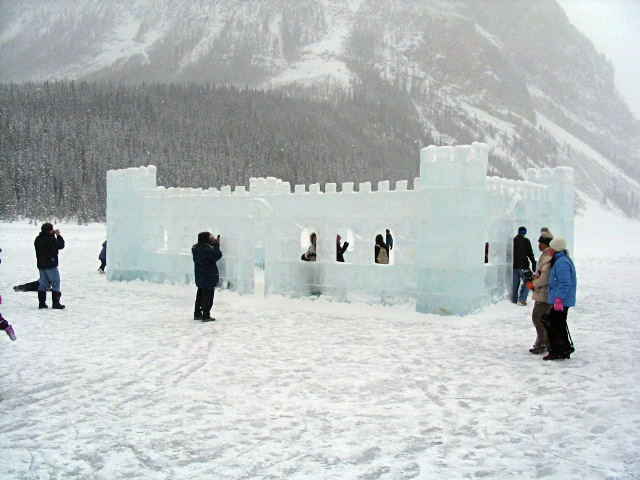
The Ice Castle at the International Ice Sculpture Competition and Exhibition 2005, Lake Louise, Alberta

In Canada, Quebec City, Quebec holds an ice sculpture festival each year during the Quebec City Winter Carnival. The sculpture festival lasts about three weeks. For the sheer variety of ice sculptures and the number of visitors, the Quebec festival is regarded by some as the best in the world. Each year, about twenty teams are chosen to participate in the competition. Half of these teams come from Canada and the others come from other countries. Ice sculpting started to become important in Quebec in the 1880s, as traditional sculptors, like Louis Jobin, turned their skills on this less permanent medium.

Each year Lake Louise, located in Banff National Park, holds a three-day event called Ice Magic in the 3rd weekend of January. Sanctioned by the National Ice Carving Association, Professional carvers are invited to compete in this event staged in the shadow of the glacier-clad Mt. Victoria. Twelve teams of three carvers are given 15 blocks of ice, weighing 300 lb each, which they must transform into ice sculptures in three days. Weather permitting; the sculptures will remain on display through March.

The annual Deep Freeze Festival in Edmonton, Alberta hosts a chisel-and-chainsaw ice carving competition the second weekend of January. Sculptures are created by professionals and amateurs using three blocks of ice. Every year a theme is chosen, in 2013 the theme was "The Wild West".

In the National Capital Region of Canada the Crystal Garden international invitational ice-carving competition starts every February, as part of the Winterlude winter festival of Ottawa. The competition site has been located in Confederation Park in Ottawa and also on the shores of Leamy lake in Gatineau, across the Ottawa River. There is a solo category, a pairs category and a one-bloc challenge. In addition to the sculptures done in the competition many ice sculptures are made to decorate the many Winterlude sites.

In Kingston, Ontario, the annual FebFest snow sculpture competition in Confederation Park in features snow forts by Royal Military College of Canada and Queen's University. The snow fort must not only be pleasing to look at but also safe for children to play on. In 2008, Royal Military College of Canada's snow fort was modelled after the MacKenzie Building in the Second Empire style with a Mansard roof and a central tower incorporating a working clock, flanked by projecting end towers and a slide. Both teams worked through the night, filling rectangular recycling bins with snow. In addition, ice sculptures of hockey players were made in memory of the first hockey game between Royal Military College of Canada and Queen's University.

About 10 km East of Quebec city, near Montmorency Falls and within the grounds of the Duchesnay winter resort the first Ice hotel in North America is erected each January. Small and medium-sized ice sculptures are used to decorate the interiors.

=== China ===
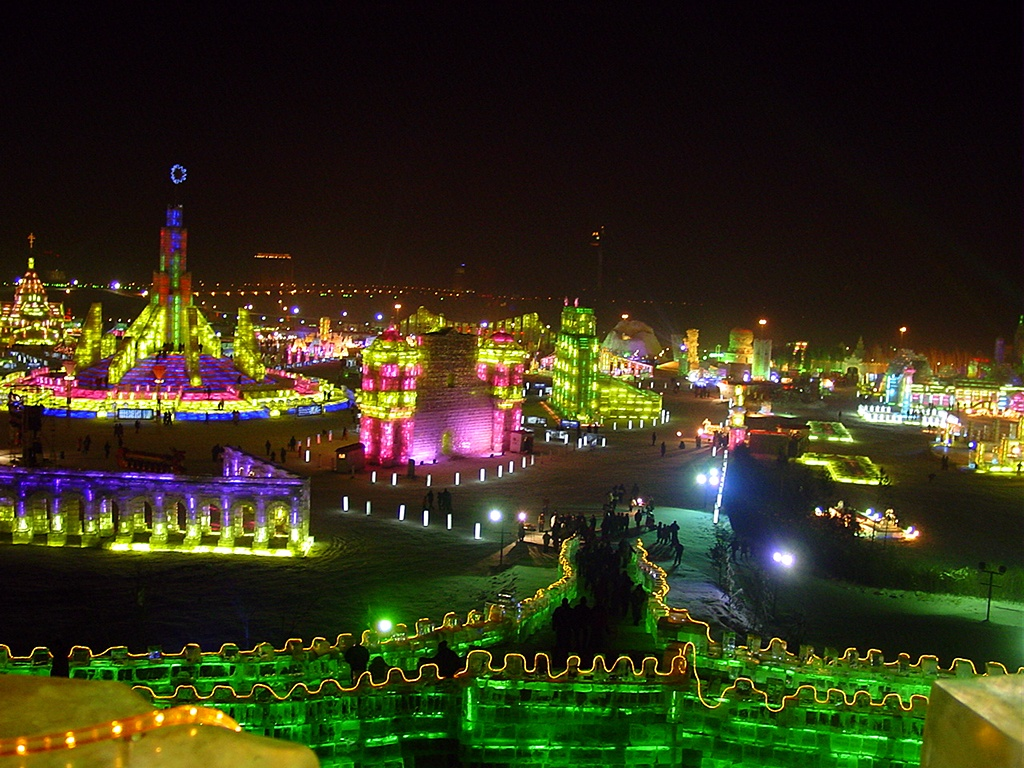
Harbin International Ice and Snow Sculpture Festival

In China, Heilongjiang Province is the most significant region for ice sculpture. The most famous event is the increasingly popular International Ice and Snow Sculpture Festival held annually in Harbin. The festival has consistently increased in size over the years, with more talented artists involved and more impressive techniques and pieces on show. Ice sculpture decoration ranges from the modern technology of lasers to traditional ice lanterns. The climate of Heilongjiang is very cold and ice is plentiful. Objects of all sizes appear, up to and including building-sized pieces.

=== France ===
French Chef Auguste Escoffier was responsible for one of the most famous early ice sculptures and French sculptors are regular participants at the World Ice Art Championships in Fairbanks, Alaska.

=== Ireland ===
Not traditionally known for Ice sculpture, Ireland has produced some well respected sculptors, winning The International Ice Sculpture Festival in Jelgava, Latvia, in years past. See also Duthain Dealbh.

=== Japan ===
The Japanese city of Sapporo on the island of Hokkaidō is famous for its winter carnival, in which teams compete to create ice sculptures. Some of these creations are the size of multiple-story buildings. A winter carnival is also held annually in Asahikawa, also on the island of Hokkaidō. Japanese sculptors have made many contributions to the art. Notable Japanese ice sculptors include Yukio Matsuo, author of "Ice Sculpture: Secrets of a Japanese Master," Mitsuo Shimizu, author of several Japanese books on ice sculpture, and Junichi Nakamura, winner of multiple world ice sculpting titles. Ice sculpture has been popular in Japan since the 1930s and an early advocate and teacher in the country was Shuko Kobayashi, the first chairman of the Japan Ice Sculpture Association.

=== Philippines ===
Most of the Filipino ice sculptors working abroad (Hotel & Luxury Cruises) came from Paete, Laguna, a small town approximately 100 km. east of Manila. The name Paete came from the word "paet", which means "chisel". Paete was declared by Philippine President Arroyo as "The Carving Capital of the Philippines" as their speciality and main source of income is woodcarving. Paetenians hold an Ice Carving Competition every year on the last week of July as a way to celebrate their town Fiesta. About 50 young natives of this town have been participating each year.

=== Russia ===
An annual competition is held at Moscow's Gorky Park, Perm Gorky Park, in Salekhard and other cities. Several Russian ice sculptors have won events at the World Ice Art Championships, including Vladimir Zhikhartsev, Sergei Loginov, and Vitaliy Lednev.

=== Sweden ===
Each winter since 1991, an ice hotel has been reconstructed in the village of Jukkasjärvi. ICEHOTEL, as it is known, is the oldest and most popular of a number of ice hotels that have since been constructed in a number of countries. ICEHOTEL is constructed almost entirely of ice and snow and each of the guest rooms feature different themes and elaborate ice and snow carving.

In 2009 an ice sculpture festival named ISSTJÄRNAN started in Sikfors, Hällefors, on the lake Sörälgen. The event takes place every year in February.

=== United States ===
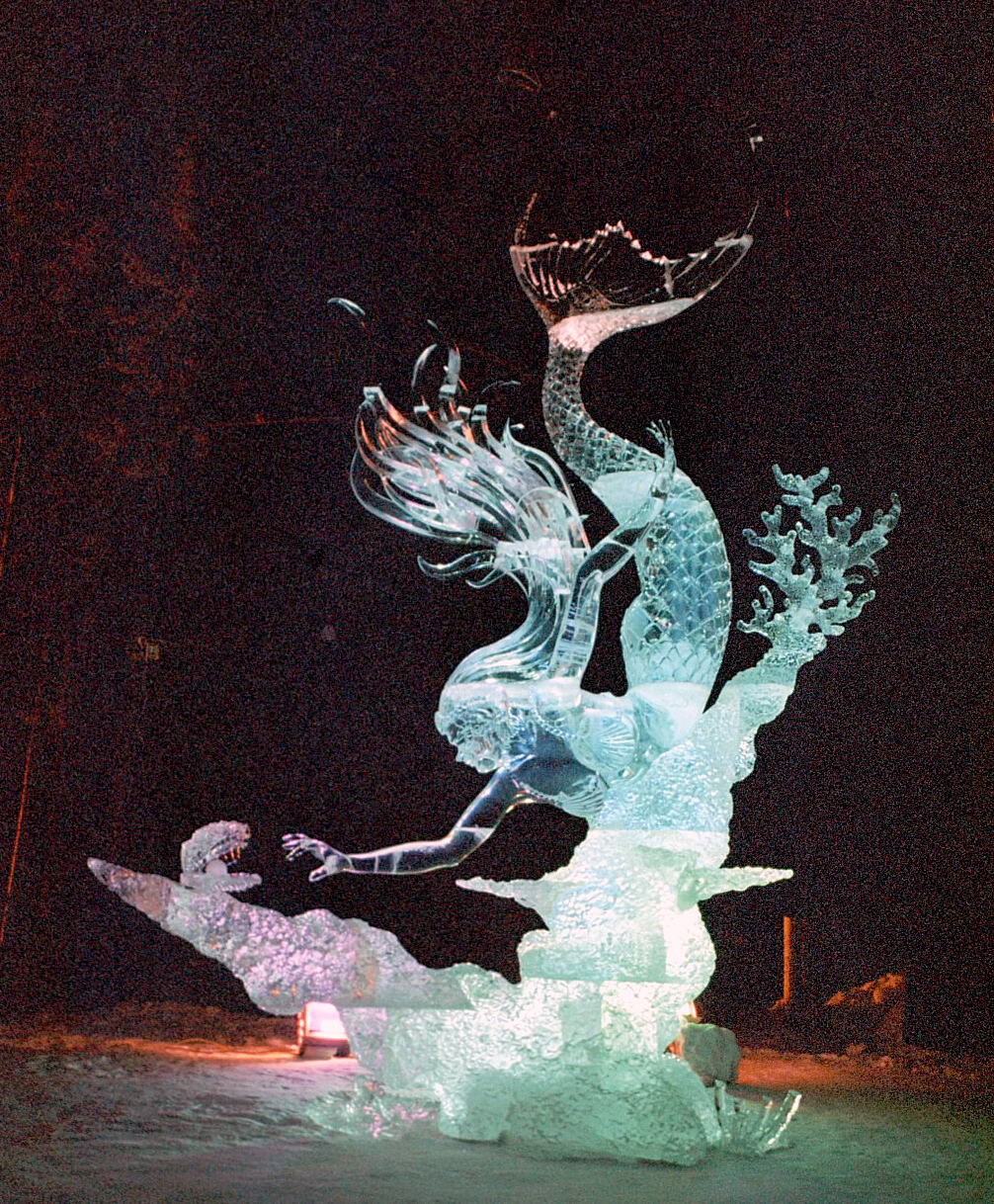
"Mysterious Pearl" 2006 in Fairbanks, AK, at the World Ice Art Championships

Since 1989, Alaska has hosted the annual World Ice Art Championships. Nearly 100 sculptors come from around the world each year to sculpt large blocks of pristine natural ice sometimes referred to as "Arctic Diamonds". The event is run almost exclusively by volunteers.

In a typical year, more than 45,000 spectators pass through the gates of the Ice Park home of the World Ice Art Championships. The competition is broken down into two main categories: Single Block and Multi-Block and each competition is further separated into Abstract and Realistic sculptures. One of the most popular attractions is the Kids Park where children of all ages can glide down ice slides or spin in ice twirly tops.

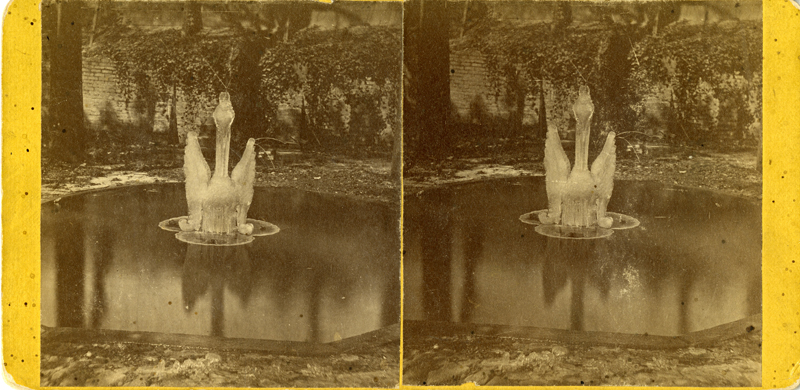
Ice sculpture at W.C. Singleton's residence in Macon, Georgia, circa 1876

Typically held the last week of February and the first week of March, spectators may view the sculptors at work during the championship competitions. In the Single Block Classic, teams of up to two persons work on a 3'×5'×8' (90 cm × 150 cm × 200 cm) block of naturally formed Alaskan ice, weighing roughly 7,800 pounds (3,500 kg). In the Multi-Block Classic, teams of up to four persons each receive ten blocks of approximately 6'×4'×3' (180 cm × 100 cm × 90 cm) each weighing about 4,400 pounds (2,000 kg). to create their crystal masterpieces. Teams that compete in both the Single Block and Multi-Block events must handle a total of 50,000 pounds (23 t) of ice. Power tools and scaffolding can be used in both events: assistance from heavy equipment is only permitted in the Multi-Block Classic Competition. Thus, participation in the event requires strength, endurance, and engineering skill as well as mastery of basic ice sculpture techniques and artistic vision.

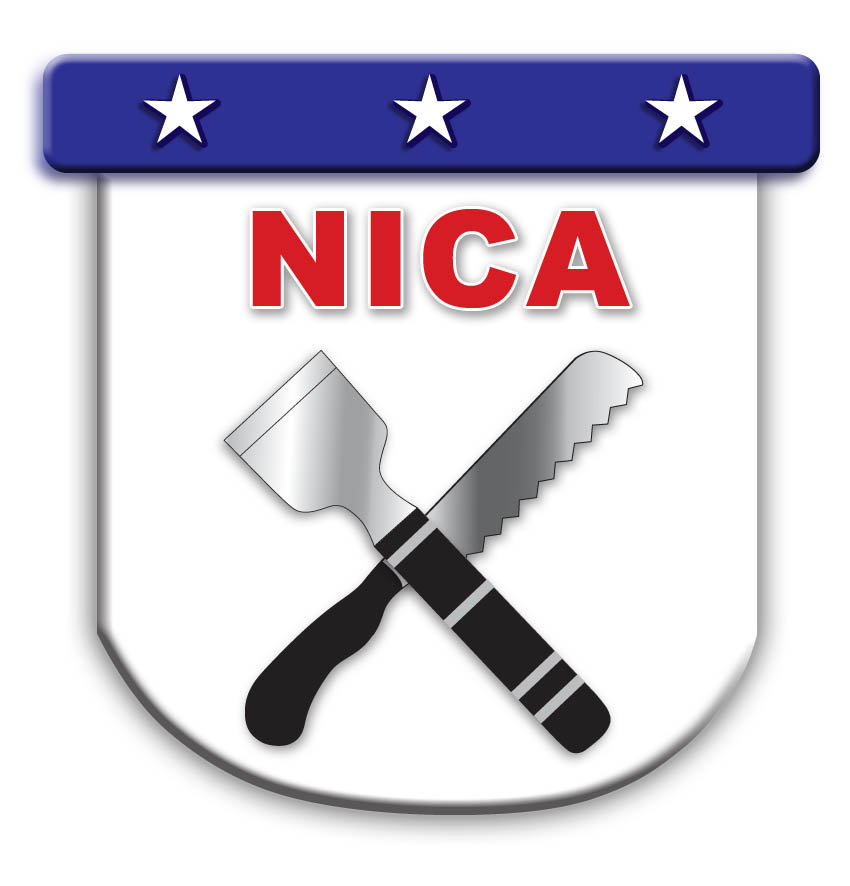
The NICA shield

The National Ice Carving Association (NICA), based in Oak Brook, Illinois (in the Chicago metro area) is an organization of ice carvers and those interested in ice carving. NICA sanctions and supports various ice sculpture competitions around the United States and in Canada and has held a yearly National Championship since 1991. The association has developed a point system for judging the quality of ice sculptures created in timed competitions and certifies competition judges. NICA also was responsible for managing the ice carving competition held in conjunction with the 2002 Winter Olympics in Salt Lake City and provided support for the 2006 event in Italy. In 2007, NICA started a "Tour of Champions" that rewards high scores over several competitions, usually including the National Championships.

=== Argentina ===
In the city of Rio Cuarto, Cordoba since 2015 there is an Ice Festival call "Roca minus zero".

=== United Kingdom ===
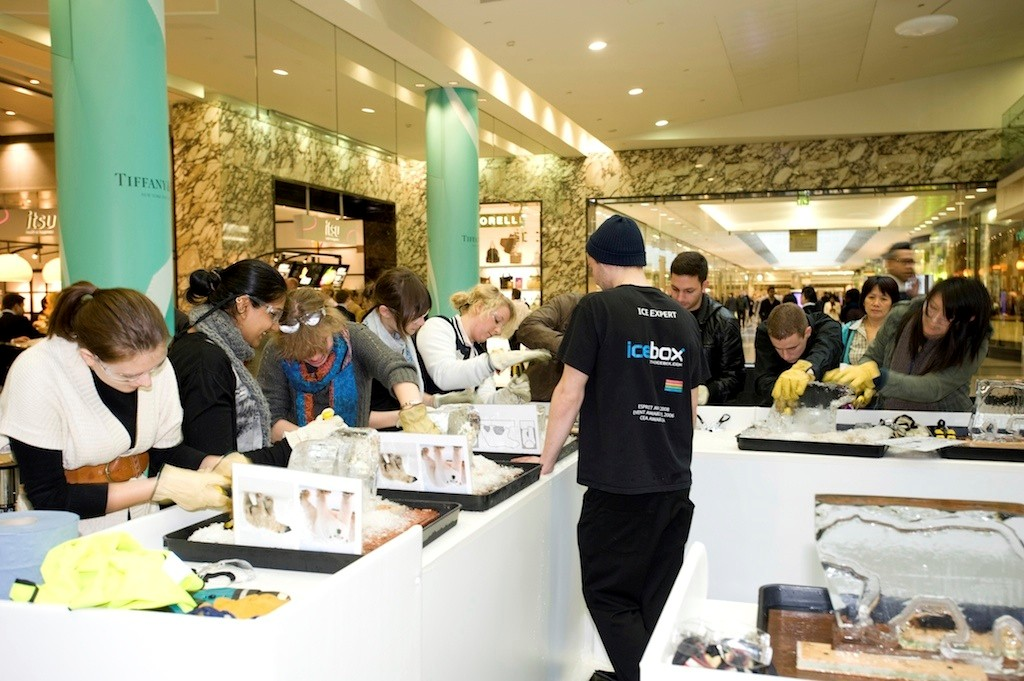
Ice sculpting classes at 2011 London Ice Sculpting Festival

The largest display of ice sculpting in the United Kingdom is the London Ice Sculpting Festival. The festival was organized in 2009 by Carol Cordrey and the Icebox. The competition is now held at Canary Wharf.

The London Ice Sculpting Festival chooses different themes every year, and for the 2012 competition chose the themes Team Spirit and Winter Sports. The 2012 winners were Jonathan Lloyd in the singles competition and Pedro Mira & Niall Magee for the doubles competition. Jonathon Lloyd also won the Public Choice Award.

The festival also provides visitors with a chance to try ice sculpting themselves with classes by the Icebox. The 2012 London Ice Sculpting Festival featured classes focused on how to sculpt a husky dog.

== See also ==
- Ice luge
- Ice palace
- Snow castle
- Snow sculpture
