= Ice Palace =

An ice palace is a castle-like structure made of ice. Ice Palace may also refer to:

== In Russia ==
- The Ice House (St. Petersburg) (1739–1740), St. Petersburg, Russia
- Ice Palace (Saint Petersburg), an arena in St. Petersburg
- Ice Palace (Cherepovets), an arena in Cherepovets
- Ice Palace Salavat Yulaev, an arena in Ufa
- CSKA Ice Palace, in Moscow
- Neftekhimik Ice Palace, in Nizhnekamsk
- Romazan Ice Sports Palace, in Magnitogorsk
- Vityaz Ice Palace, in Podolsk

== In other countries ==
- The Benchmark International Arena, a hockey arena in Tampa, Florida, formerly called the Ice Palace
- The Miami Coliseum, a now-demolished hockey arena in Miami, Florida that was once called the Metropolitan Ice Palace
- Eispalast, a facility in the Jungfraujoch station of the Jungfraubahn in Switzerland
- The Ice Palace at the Quebec Winter Carnival in Quebec City, Canada.
- Stonewall Arena, formerly called Ice Palace, in Stonewall, Manitoba, Canada
- in Belarus: Minsk Ice Palace and Brest Ice Palace.

== Other uses ==
- The Ice Palace (novel), (Is-slottet), a 1963 Norwegian novel by Tarjei Vesaas
  - The Ice Palace (1987 film), a 1987 Norwegian film
- Ice Palace, a 1958 novel by Edna Ferber
  - Ice Palace (film), a 1960 film based on the novel, starring Richard Burton
- "The Ice Palace (short story)", a 1920 short story by F. Scott Fitzgerald
- The Ice Palace, an American variety television series with an ice skating theme, which aired on CBS for ten weeks in 1971
- Ice Palace (1985 video game), a 1985 video game by Creative Sparks
- The Ice Palace (TV show), a 1971 American television variety show

== See also ==
- Ice castle (disambiguation)
