= Ice hotel =

Temporary hotel made up of snow and blocks of ice

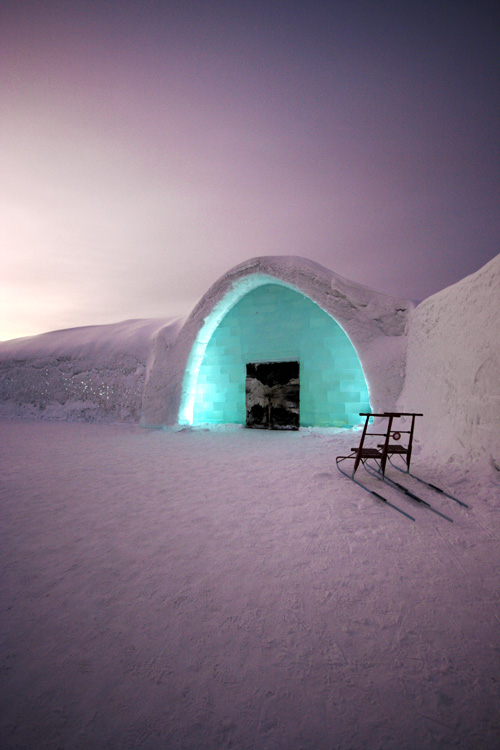
The entrance of Icehotel in Jukkasjärvi, Sweden, 2007, with two kicksleds outside

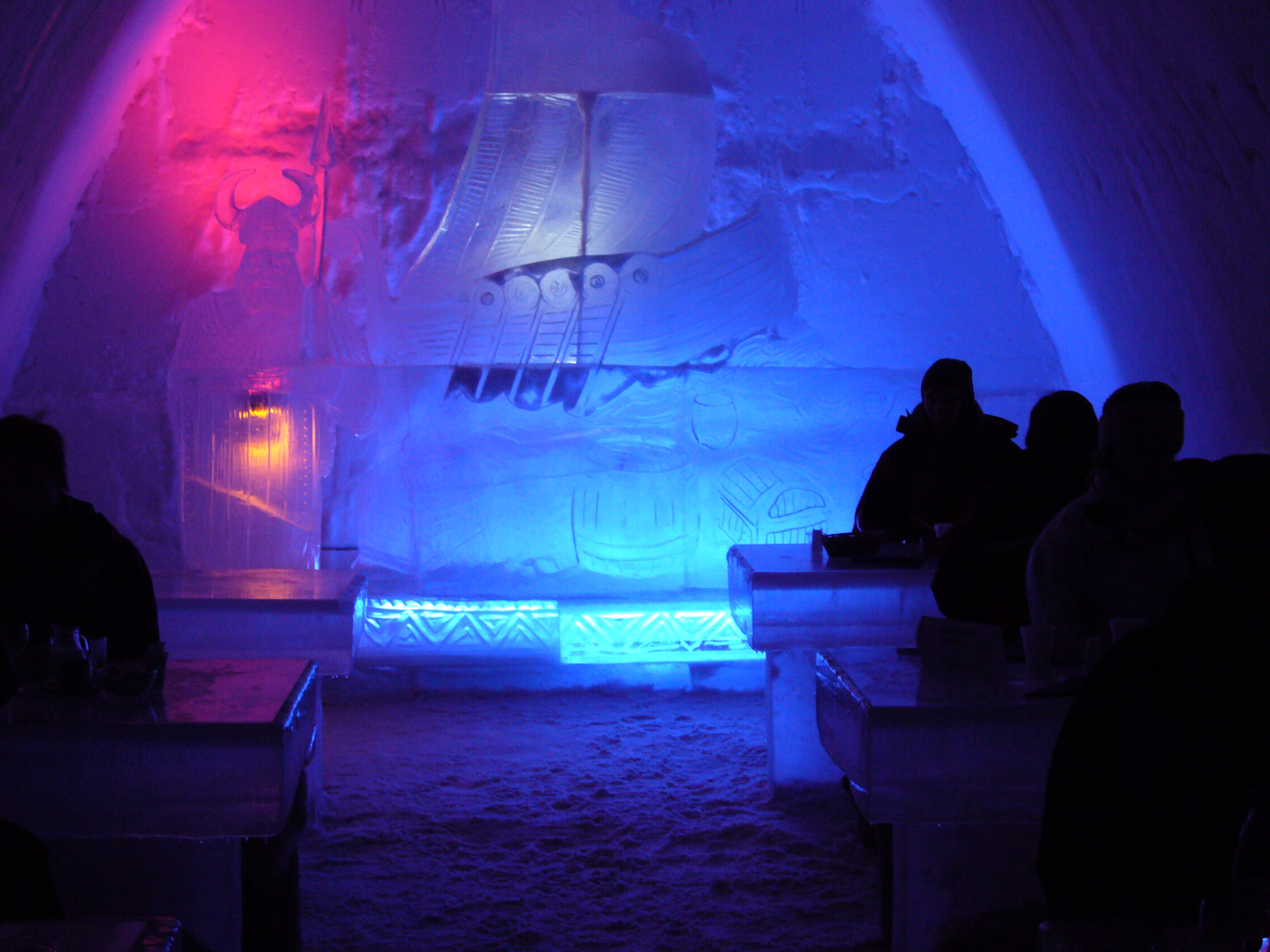
Patrons at the ice bar at SnowCastle of Kemi, 2007

An ice hotel is a temporary hotel made up of snow and sculpted blocks of ice. Ice hotels, dependent on sub-freezing temperatures, are constructed from ice and snow and typically have to be rebuilt every year. Ice hotels exist in several countries, and they have varying construction styles, services and amenities, the latter of which may include ice bars, restaurants, chapels, saunas and hot tubs.

== Overview ==
Ice hotels are promoted for adventurous travelers who are interested in novelties and unusual environments and are comfortable with the outdoors. Customers have to be prepared to sleep in beds made of snow or ice, but in the warmth of furs, blankets and sleeping bags designed to withstand extremely cold temperatures. Temperature in the rooms is below zero Celsius, but much warmer than outside. Staying at an ice hotel is expensive as prices for a night range from around US$300 to $3,000. Some ice hotels may be destination hotels.

Lobbies are often filled with ice sculptures, and food and drinks are specially chosen for the circumstances. For instance, glasses in an ice bar can be made of ice and people sit on benches made of ice. An ice bar, sometimes associated with an ice hotel, is a drinking establishment primarily made of ice.

== Construction ==
Ice hotels are dependent upon sub-freezing temperatures (colder than 0 °C or 32 °F) during construction and operation. This imposes time constraints on construction and makes the hotel's season short. Construction typically begins between November and March when snow can be compacted and thick levels of ice form. Although constructing an ice hotel is more labor-intensive than a regular building, building materials are cheaper. Ice hotels have to be reconstructed every year. This is not entirely detrimental to the operators; if an ice hotel does not meet its financial goals, the owner can simply let the building melt in the spring and is left with no building to permanently upkeep.

The walls, fixtures, and fittings are made entirely of ice or compacted snow, and are held together using a substance known as snice, which takes the place of mortar in a traditional brick-built hotel. Sometimes steel framing is used in their construction.

== By country ==
=== Canada ===
==== Ice Hotel ====
The Hôtel de Glace (English: Ice Hotel) first opened in January 2001. 85 rooms are furnished with ice beds covered with deer furs and mattresses and equipped with arctic sleeping bags. It was originally located on the shores of Lac-Saint-Joseph, Quebec, 31 minutes north of Quebec City, but has since moved closer to the city, 10 minutes away from Old Town Quebec. It operates from the first week in January to the last week in March. It has the adjacent Le Quatre Temps restaurant, an ice bar named Absolut Ice Bar, which serves Absolut Vodka and other beverages, sauna and outdoor hot tub. Construction involves the use of blocks of ice and snow. In 2005, construction involved "400 tons of clear ice blocks, trucked in from Montreal, and 12,000 tons of snow produced on site." Beds are constructed of ice, which are topped with "a wooden boxspring and mattress", and mummy-style sleeping bags are provided. The hotel offers paid tours, the participants of which are allowed to use the ice bar until midnight. Ice Hotel was previously the only ice hotel in North America.

Ice Hotel

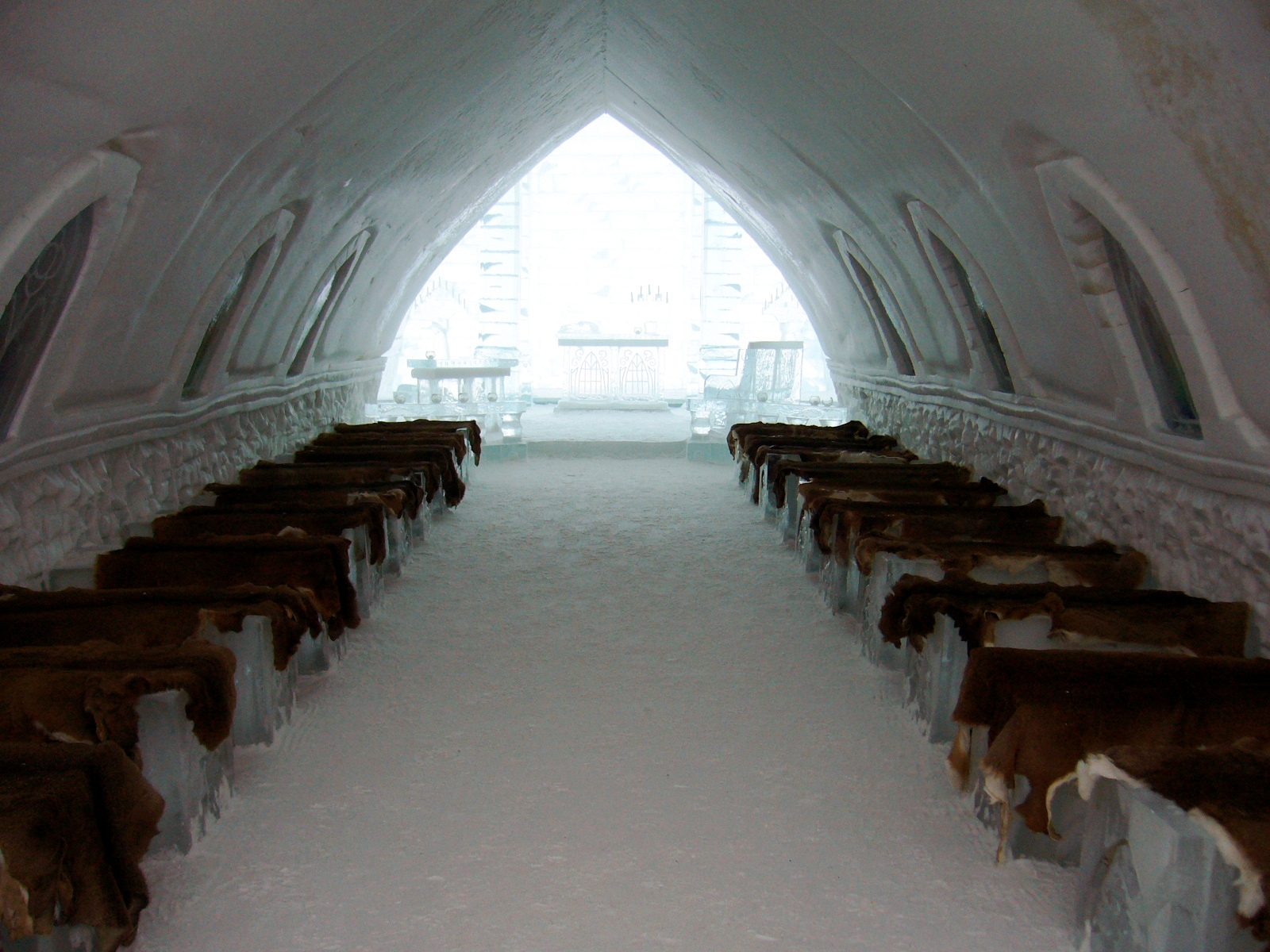
The chapel, 2006

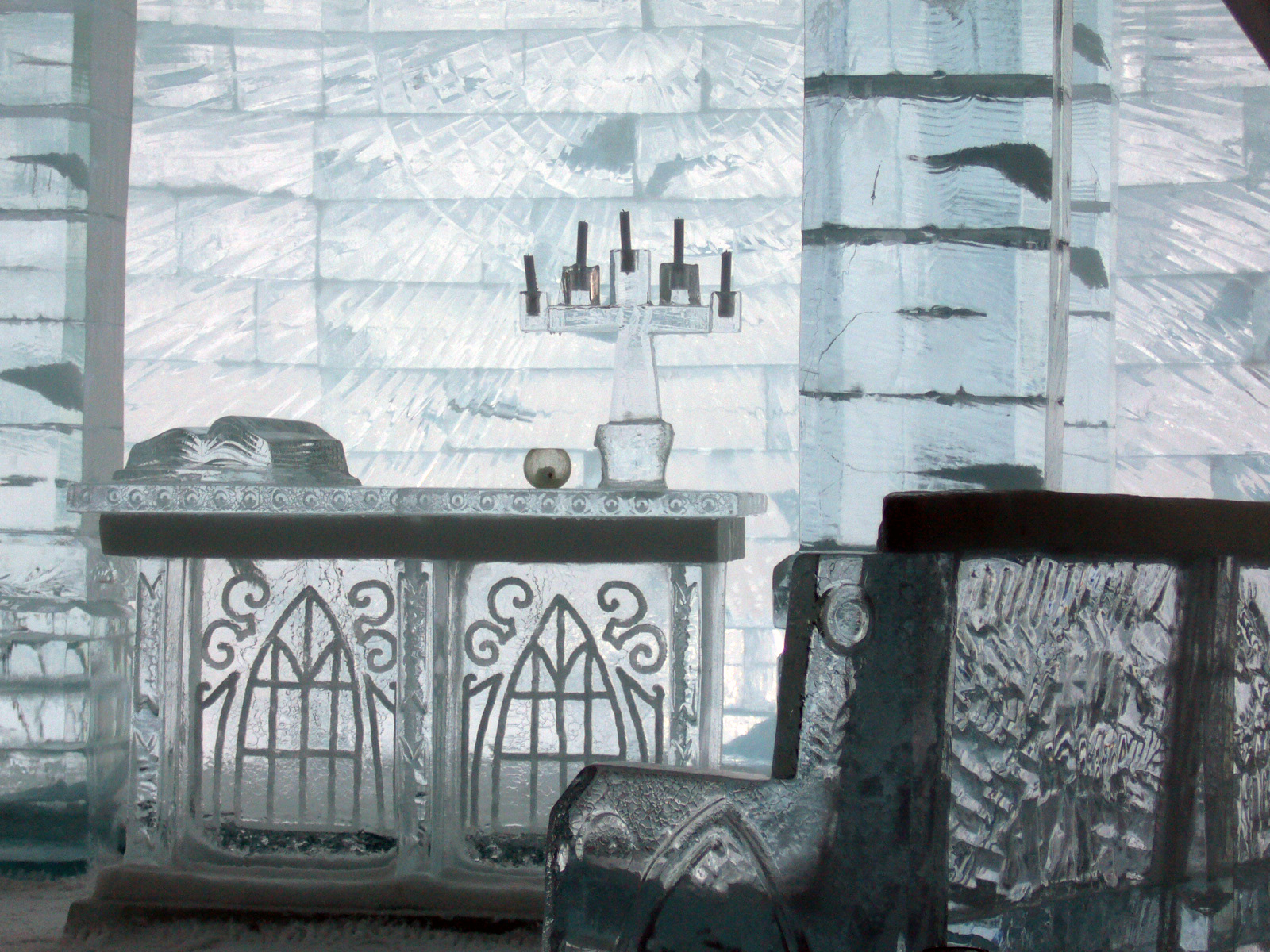
The chapel, 2006

==== Snow Village ====
Snow Village is a half-hectare village and 30-room ice hotel located in Parc Jean-Drapeau, east of Montreal, in Quebec, Canada that first opened in 2012. It has suites, standard rooms and igloos, an ice restaurant, ice bar and patio, ice chapel and outdoor hot tubs. It is constructed from man-made snow created by snowmaking machines, which is blown onto frames that are removed when construction is complete. This is performed because the density of the artificial snow is greater than that of natural snow. The hotel is equipped with fire alarms that are built into snow walls, as required by the city of Montreal. Initial construction cost $2.1 million, and the Quebec government provided some financial support for its construction.

=== Finland ===
==== SnowCastle of Kemi ====
The SnowCastle of Kemi in Kemi, Finland is the largest snow fort in the world, is rebuilt every winter and has a snow hotel with double rooms and a honeymoon suite. The facility also has a restaurant, chapel, and ice sculptures. It is near the Gulf of Bothnia. The style of the facility, including the theme, shape, size and decorations, changes annually.

SnowCastle of Kemi

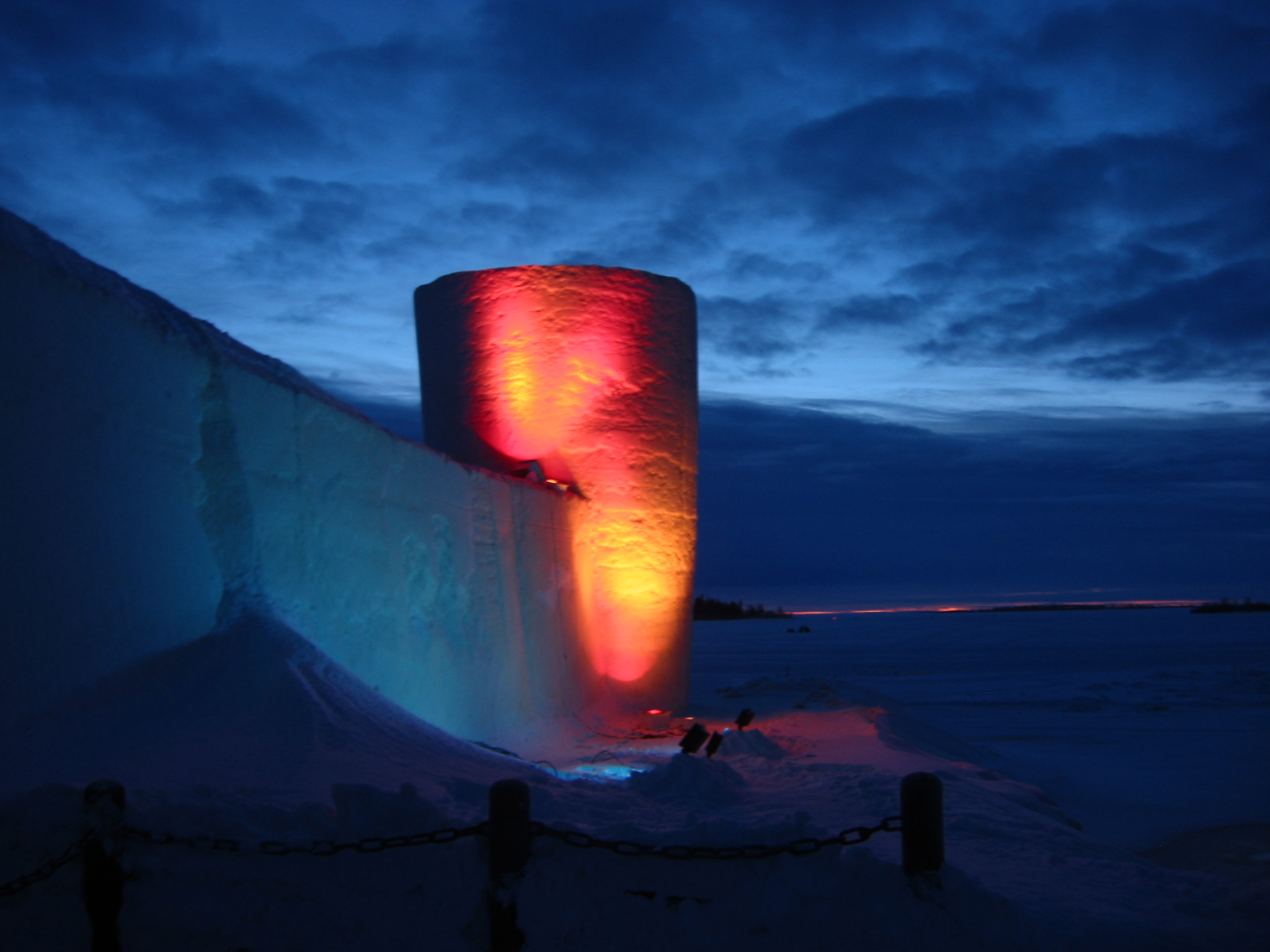
A view in 2006

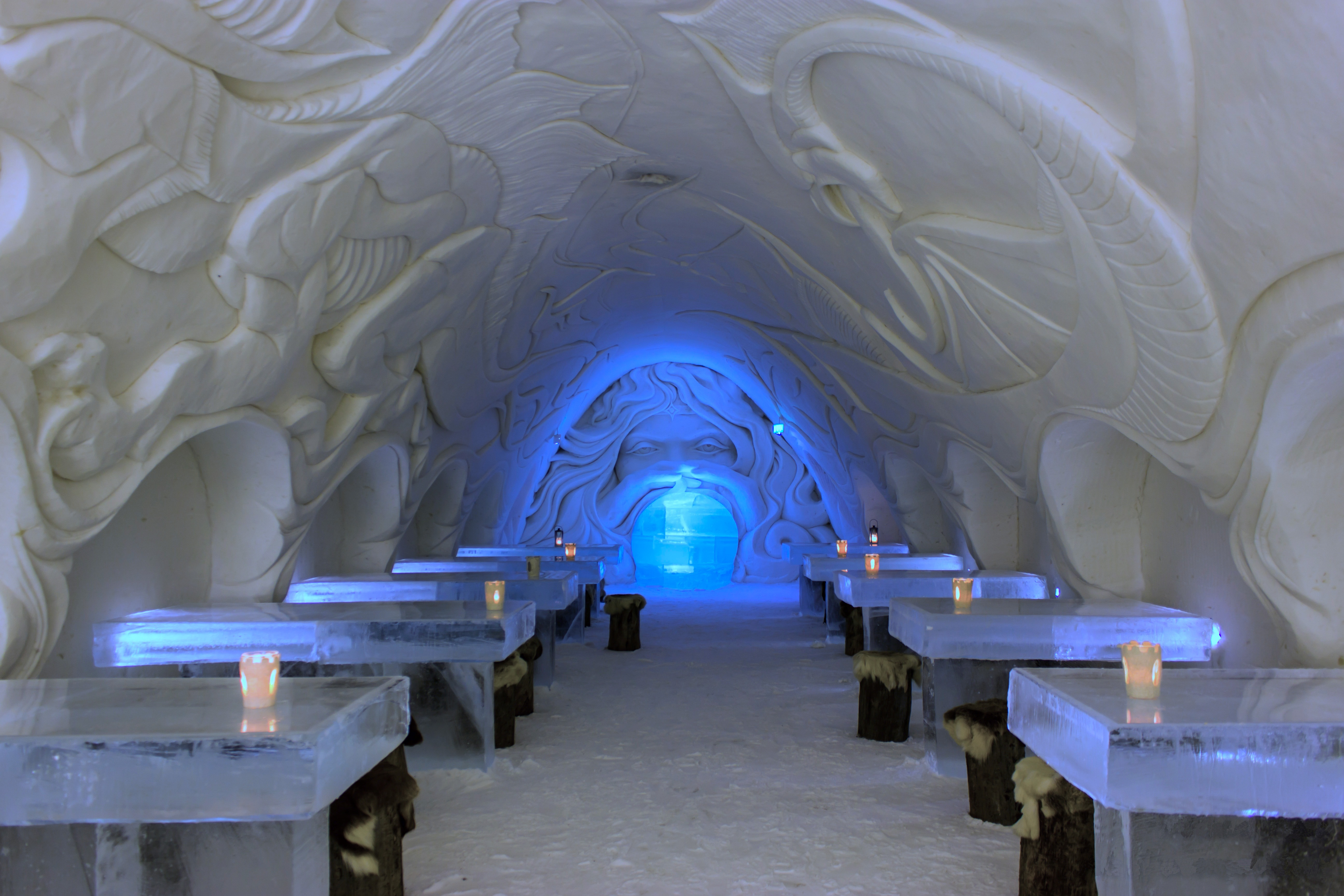
The dining room in February 2013

==== Lainio Snow Village ====
The Lainio Snow Village is located 150 km north of the Arctic Circle in Lapland. This snow hotel is built in the winter atop a wood building. In 2007, construction began in November, and in December, it began providing lodging. The hotel has restrooms and a sauna, and the village has a restaurant. Rooms are decorated with artwork created from snow. In 2007, art students contributed to the art with professional artists. In the summer, the village provides log cabin lodging.

=== Japan ===
The Alpha Resort Tomamu in the Shimukappu village of Hokkaido Island in Japan builds and opens an ice hotel every year. It may be Japan's first ice hotel, and everything in it is constructed from ice. The hotel interiors are typically −3 to −5 °C. Guests dine on ice tables and sit on ice chairs covered with sheepskin. The hotel provides sheepskin apparel for guests to stay warm.

=== Norway ===
==== Ice Bar ====
Ice Bar, run by Ice Hotel, is a bar located in downtown Oslo, Norway which serves drinks all year long in an artificially frozen environment.

==== Ice Lodge ====
The Ice Lodge in Norway is part of the Bjorligard Hotel. It is the largest ice hotel in Norway, and its season is longer than other ice hotels due to its elevation at 1,250 metres (4,100 ft) above sea level.

==== Kirkenes Snow Hotel ====
The Kirkenes Snow Hotel is located in Finnmark, Norway, the easternmost and northernmost county in Norway. The hotel is 15 km from the Norwegian-Russian border and first opened in 2006. It had 20 rooms and the largest snow dome in Norway (8 metres high and 12 metres in diameter). All the rooms were individually decorated by ice artists from Finland and Japan. The west Snow Hall was decorated by local sculptor Arild Wara. A night in the snow hotel is combined with a special dinner prepared on an open fire. Visitors can get a sauna before or after staying at the hotel. The hotel has an ice bar, a reindeer park, and a husky farm. The hotel has become a popular destination for winter tourists seeking northern lights viewing in Arctic Norway.

==== Sorrisniva Igloo Hotel ====
Sorrisniva Igloo Hotel is located in rural Alta Municipality, about 20 kilometres (12 mi) south of the town of Alta. The igloo hotel has been rebuilt yearly since 1999. It is Europe’s northernmost ice hotel, as it is in the Finnmark region and is approximately 250 kilometres (160 mi) from the North Cape. The 2,000-square-metre (22,000 sq ft) hotel has 30 rooms, including two suites. It is decorated with ice sculptures and ice furnishings, including lighting systems which enhance the different types of crystalline formations. Besides the bedrooms the hotel contains an ice chapel, ice gallery and ice bar where drinks are served in glasses made of ice. Additional facilities include a sauna and outdoor bathtubs with hot water. The ice sculptures at the hotel change yearly. The Sorrisniva Igloo Hotel in Alta has a changing theme every year. In 2004, it was a Viking theme, in 2005, Norwegian fairytales, and in 2006, the theme was wild animals of the region. To stay warm when sleeping, guests use sleeping bags that sit on top of reindeer hides.

Sorrisniva Igloo Hotel

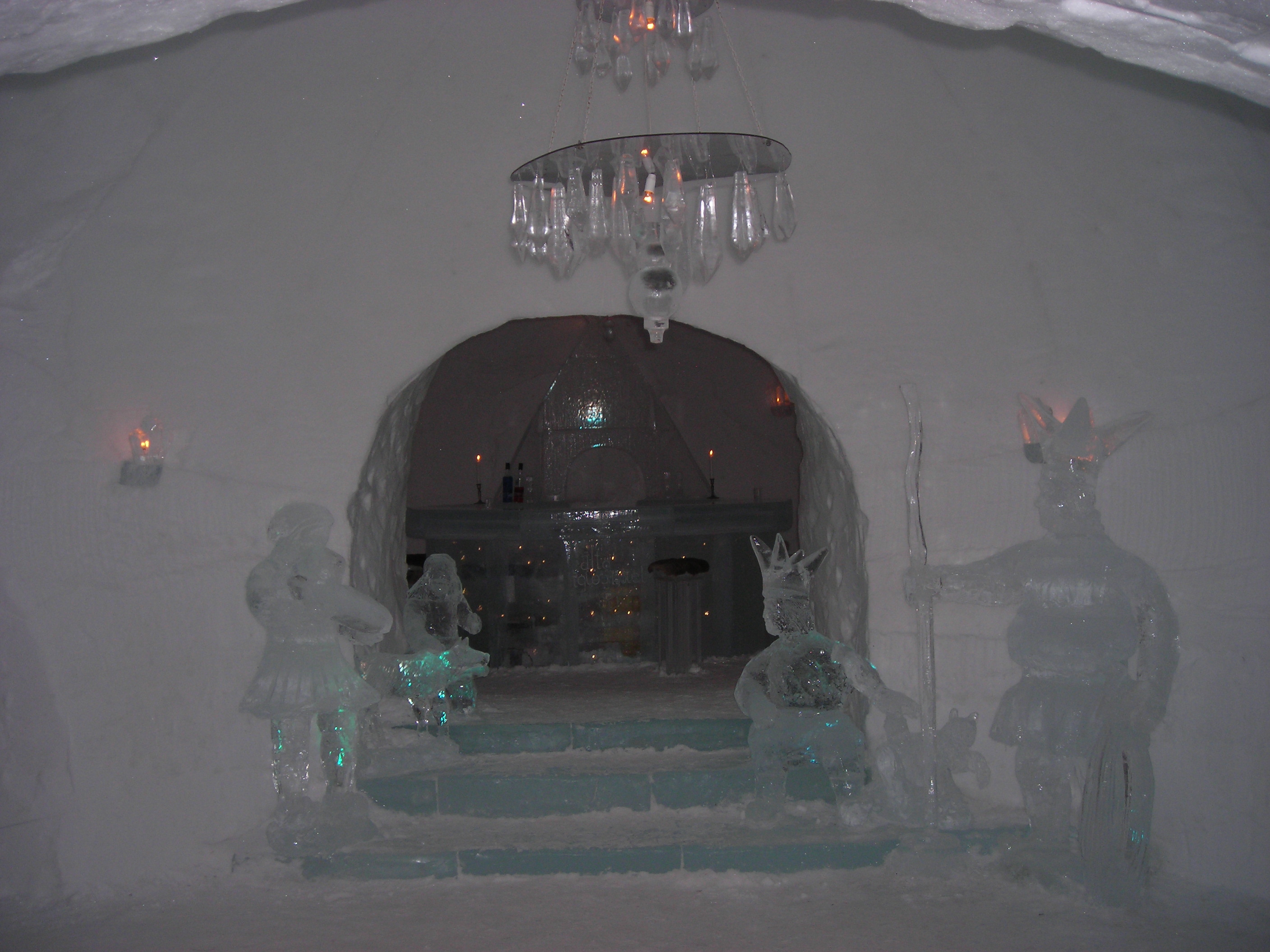
Entrance to the ice bar

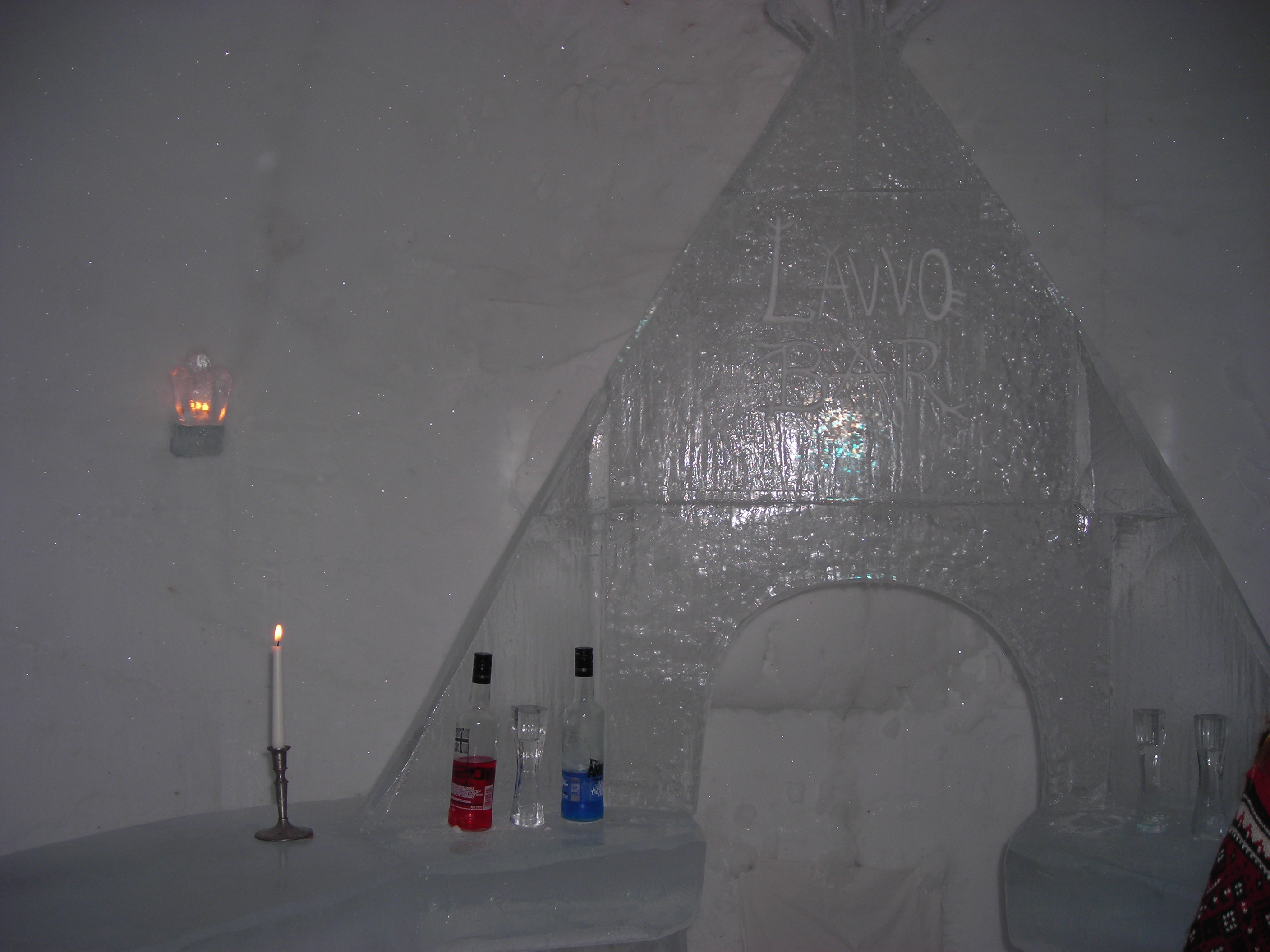
Interior of the ice bar

=== Romania ===
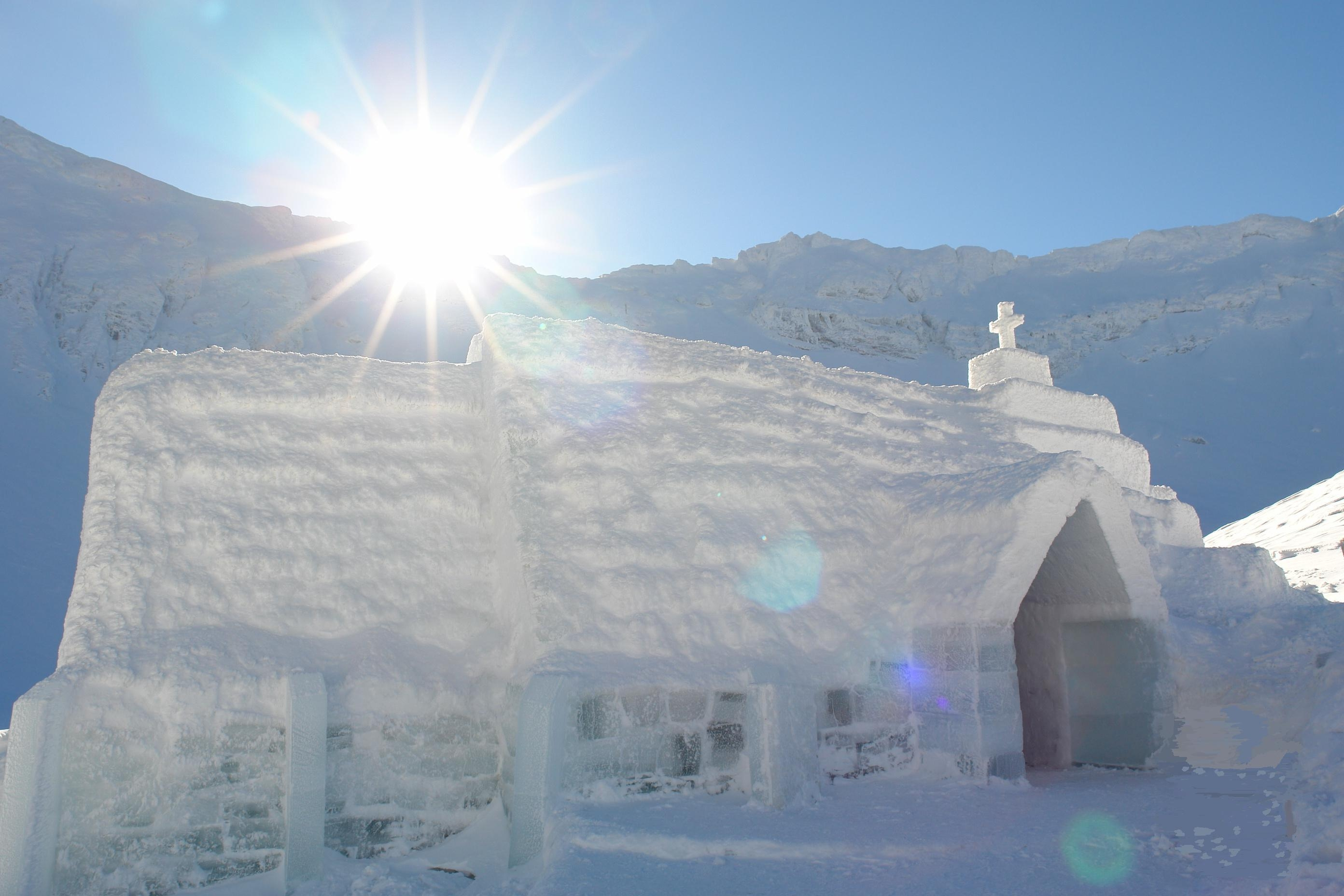
Ice Church in Romania, 2011

Bâlea Lake Ice Hotel, the first ice hotel in Eastern Europe, was built in 2006 in Romania, deep in the Făgăraș Mountains at an elevation of 2034 meters above sea level. In winter it is only accessible by cable car, since the national road DN7, the Transfăgărășan, is closed in the winter.

This picturesque setting is next to Bâlea Lake, where each year local craftsmen wait for the lake to freeze before using the ice to build the small 12-room Ice Hotel and its adjacent Ice Church, Ice Restaurant, and Ice Bar. Local artists imitate sculptures by Romanian modernist sculptor Constantin Brâncuși. Typically the hotel is completed in December and remains open until it melts in late March or April.

Bedding, furs, and special sleeping bags are all provided, with bathroom facilities nearby. There are two chalets within walking distance which also provide accommodation. Activities such as skiing, sledging, and riding a snow bike are on offer. Those who are more organised and adventurous can arrange heliskiing.

The Bâlea Lake Ice Hotel is Romanian owned, but has a relationship with the travel company Untravelled Paths Limited, based in the United Kingdom.

=== Sweden ===
==== Icehotel Jukkasjärvi ====
Each year between December and April, the Icehotel in the village of Jukkasjärvi is open. It is about 17 km from Kiruna, Sweden, and it was the world's first ice hotel. 80 rooms and suites are available. In addition to the entrance hall, the hotel has a chapel and an ice bar named Absolut Icebar. In 1989, Japanese ice artists visited the area and created an exhibition of ice art. In spring 1990, French artist Jannot Derid held an exhibition in a cylinder-shaped igloo in the area. One night there were no rooms available in the town, so some of the visitors asked for permission to spend the night in the exhibition hall. They slept in sleeping bags on top of reindeer skin.

The entire hotel is made out of snow and ice blocks taken from the Torne River; even the glasses in the bar are made of ice. Each spring, around March, Icehotel harvests ice from the frozen river and stores it in a nearby production hall with room for over 100,000 tons of ice and 30,000 tons of snow. Some of the blocks of ice weigh two tons, and cranes are used to place them. The ice is used for creating Icebar designs and ice glasses, for ice sculpting classes, events and product launches all over the world while the snow is used for building a strong structure for the building. About 1,000 tons of what is left is used in the construction of the next Icehotel.

Each year, for the past 24 years now, the ice hotel has accepted applications from artists around the world to design the world-famous hotel's art suites. In 2013 there were more than 200 applications submitted from a wide range of artists to design and build an Art Suite. These included artists from a variety of creative backgrounds – including theatre and photography, to interior design and architecture. Around 15 applications are accepted with their designs and head there in November to build the suites.

Icehotel

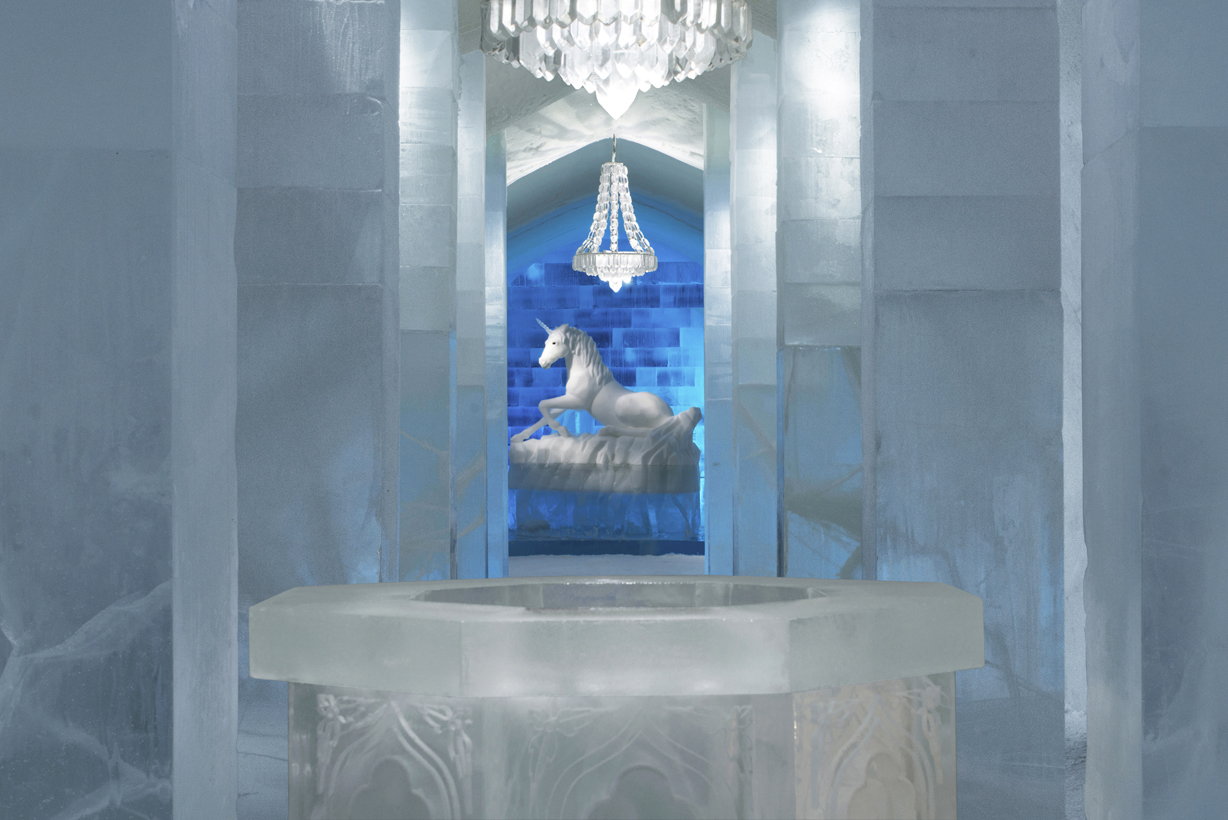
Main Hall "Secret Garden" at Icehotel in Jukkasjärvi, Sweden (January 2014)

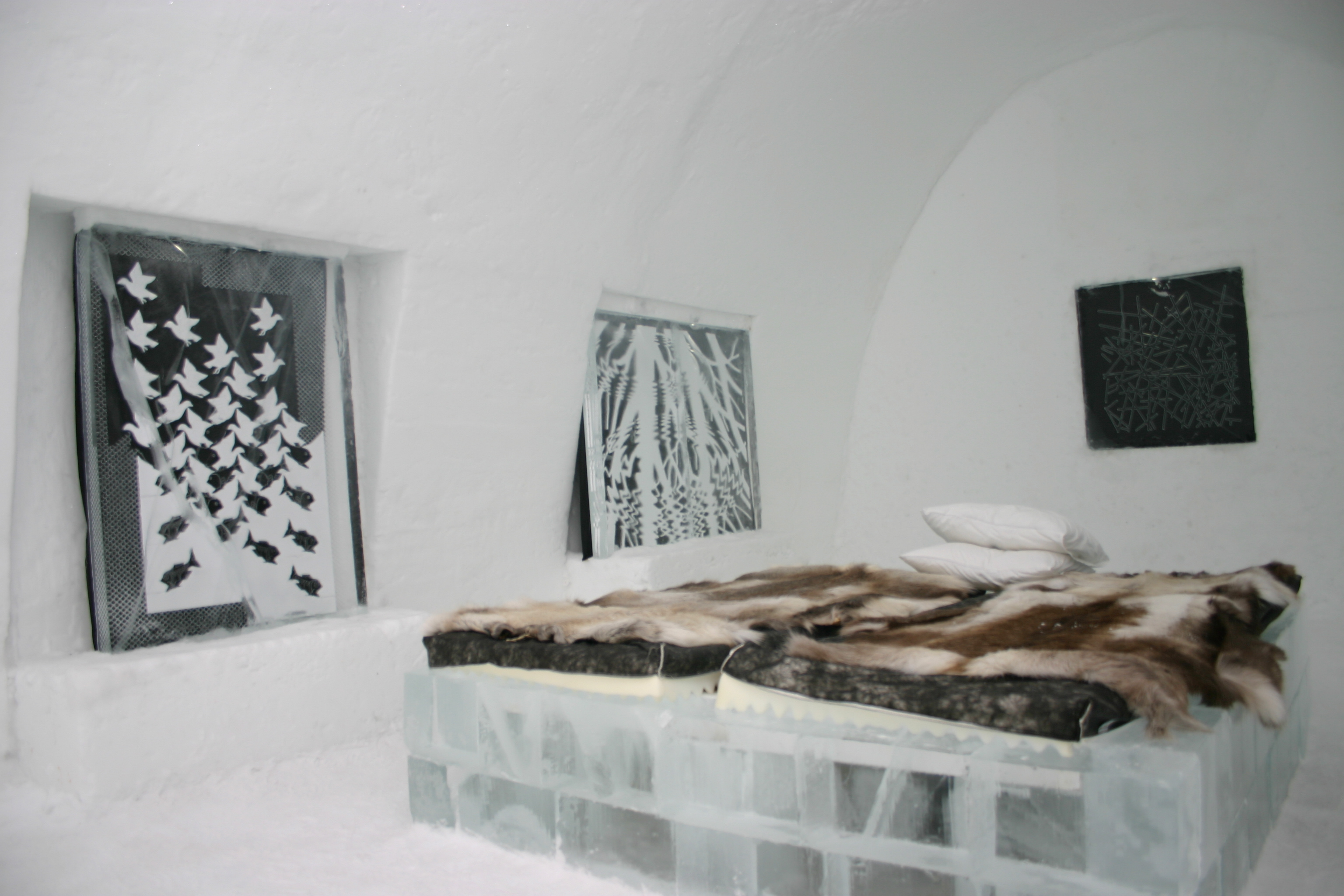
A room at the Icehotel

==== IGLOOTEL Lapland ====
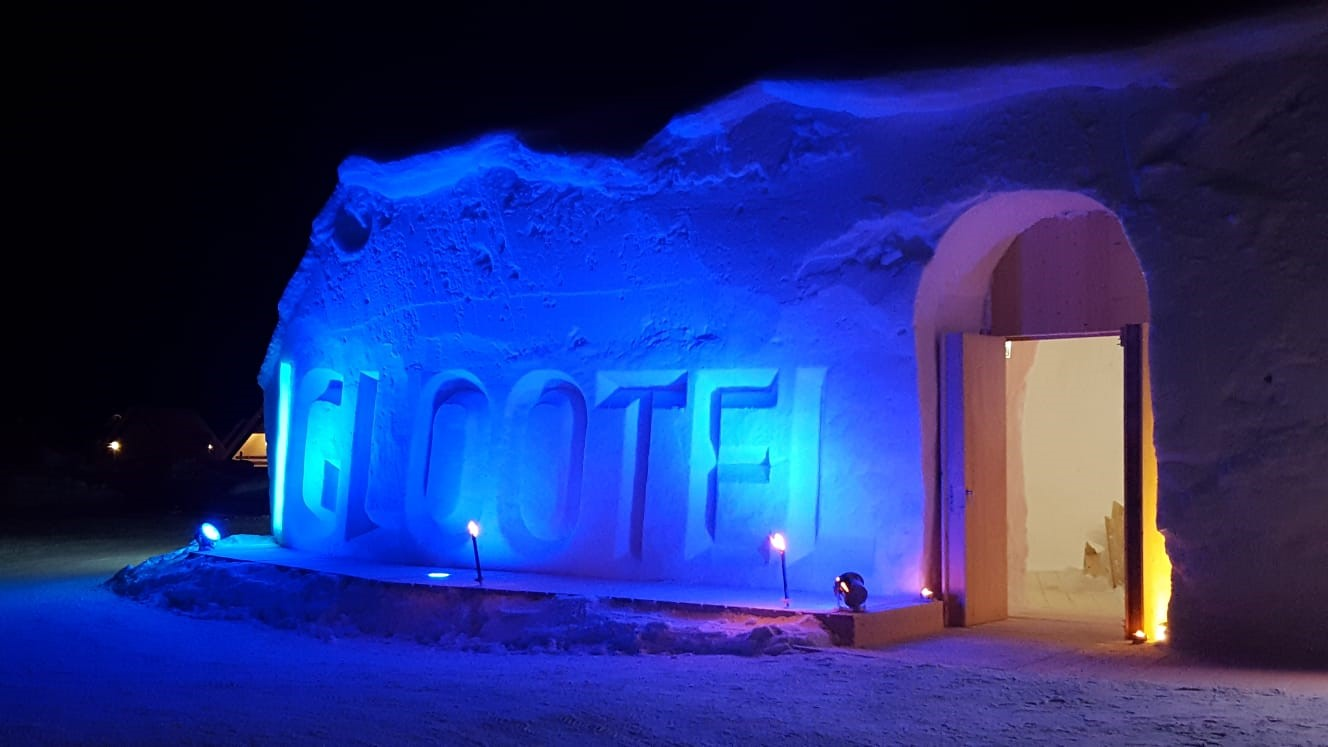
IGLOOTEL Entrance Area

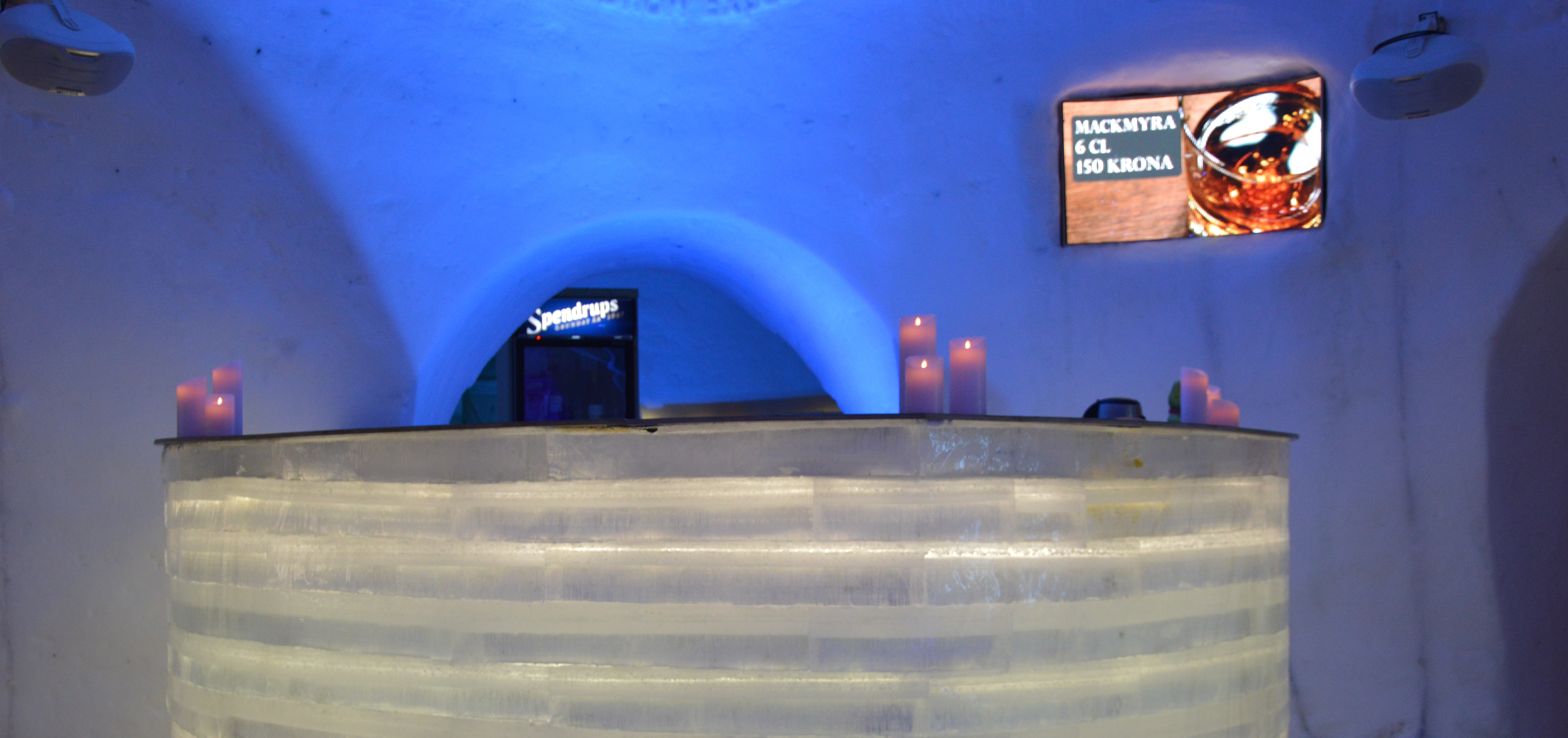
Bar-IGLOO 2016

IGLOOTEL Lapland is located in Piteå, Sweden approx. 100 km south of the Arctic Circle. Every winter IGLOOTEL is built and designed from scratch in cooperation with engineers and designers. IGLOOTEL consists of different IGLOOs, for example Sleeping-IGLOOs, Event-IGLOOs, an Ice-Bar and an Aurora Spa Area with a wood fired Outdoor Sauna and Hot Tubs. The IGLOOs are connected through hallways, which are also made of snow and ice. IGLOOTEL has an inner surface area of approx. 900 – 1.000 m2.

Engravings in the snow and ice walls, illuminations and other art varies and creates a new, individual theme each year. Design students from an Art Academy develop the theme and create unique art work in each of the IGLOOs. Natural materials, for example local woods and reindeer skins are used to establish a comfortable atmosphere. The temperature inside IGLOOTEL is constantly between 0 °C (32 °F) and -4 °C (25 °F). The beds in IGLOOTEL Lapland are built on wooden platforms with mattresses and reindeer skins. Guests sleep in polar sleeping bags.

=== Switzerland ===
The ski resort in the village of Gstaad, Switzerland in the Swiss Alps has an igloo village where guests can rent igloos for overnight lodging. In the igloos, sleeping areas are raised, and are "layered with foam, carpet and sheep skins", atop which sleeping bags are provided. Lighting is provided by candles.

== See also ==
- Ice palace – a castle-like structure made of blocks of ice
- Ice pier – a man-made structure used to assist the unloading of ships in Antarctica
- Ice road – frozen, human-made pathway on the surface of bays, rivers, lakes, or seas in polar regions
- ICIUM – a winter entertainment park built in Levi, Finland from ice and snow
- List of ice and snow sculpture events
- Michigan Technological University's Winter Carnival – an annual celebration in Houghton, Michigan that includes the construction of large snow structures
- Palacio de Sal – Spanish for "palace of salt", it is a hotel built of salt blocks
- Snowking Winter Festival – an annual festival held each March in Yellowknife, Northwest Territories, Canada that includes the construction of a large snow castle
- Winter carnival
