= Since =

Since may refer to:

== Places ==
- Sincé, Sucre Department, Colombia
- Sińce, West Pomeranian Voivodeship, Poland

== Other ==
- Since (film), a 1966 film by Andy Warhol
- Since (album), a 1998 album by Richard Buckner
- Since (rapper) (born 1992), South Korean rapper

== See also ==
- Snice
