= Ice castle =

Ice castle may refer to:

- Ice palace, a building made of blocks of ice
- Frost flowers, the natural phenomenon
- Ice Castles, a 1978 American romantic drama film
- Ice Castles (2010 film), a 2010 remake of the 1978 film
- "Ice Castles", song by Ween from their 2000 album White Pepper
- Ice Castles, album by Larry Heard

== See also ==
- Ice Palace (disambiguation)
