= Debbie Dean =

Debbie Dean may refer to:

- Debbie Dean (Hollyoaks), a fictional character from the British soap opera Hollyoaks
- Debbie Dean (singer), American singer

== See also ==
- Debra Dean, American writer
- Debra Dean (EastEnders), a fictional character from the British soap opera EastEnders
