= SnowCastle of Kemi =

Annual snow fort in Finland

Coordinates: 65.7261°N 24.5687°E

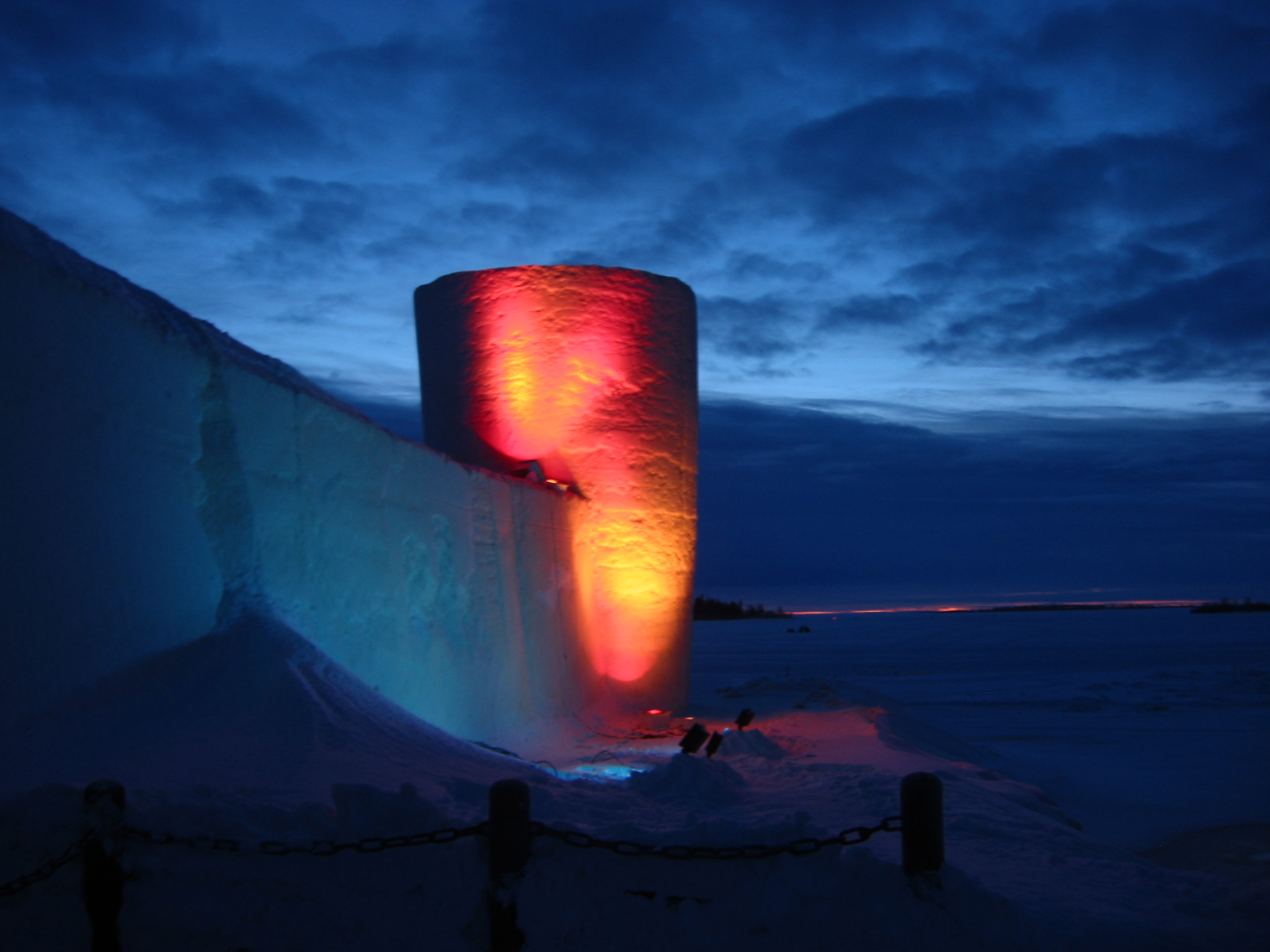
SnowCastle in 2006

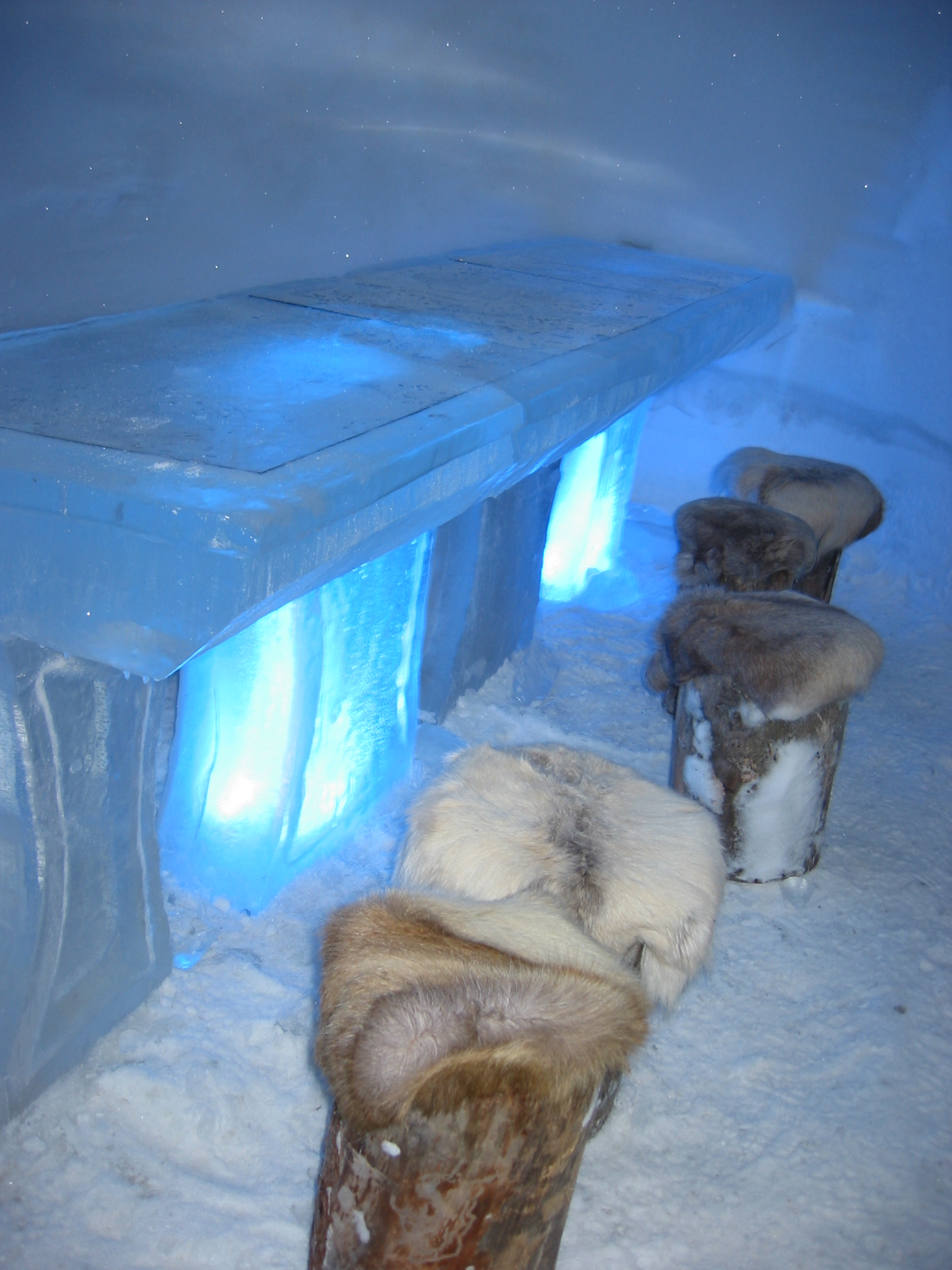
Snow Restaurant

The SnowCastle of Kemi (Finnish: Kemin lumilinna) is the biggest snow fort in the world. It is rebuilt every winter with a different architecture in Kemi, Finland. In 1996, the first snow castle drew 300,000 visitors. For several years the snowcastle was located in the Kemi city harbor. In 2017 the location was moved into a nearby park. Its current address is Mansikkanokankatu 15.

The area covered by the castle has varied from 13,000 to 20,000 square metres (140,000 to 220,000 sq ft). The highest towers have been over 20 metres (66 ft) high and longest walls over 1,000 metres (3,300 ft) long, and the castle has had up to three stories. Despite its varying configurations, the snow castle has a few recurring elements: a chapel, a restaurant and a hotel.

- The ecumenical SnowChapel with 50–100 seats has seen numerous weddings of couples from as far away as Japan and Hong Kong.
- The SnowRestaurant has ice tables and seats covered with reindeer fur, as well as ice sculptures.
- The SnowHotel offers a choice of double rooms and a honeymoon suite, all of which are decorated by local artists using local materials.

The SnowCastle of Kemi also hosts such things as an adventure land for children, a theatre and ice art exhibitions with lights and sound effects. Many opera singers and dancers have performed in the SnowCastle of Kemi.

== See also ==
- Ice hotel
- Ice palace
