= Confessions of a Falling Woman =

2008 short story collection by Debra Dean

Confessions of a Falling Woman and Other Stories
- Author: Debra Dean
- Language: English
- Genre: Fiction
- Published: 2008 (HarperCollins)
- Publication place: USA
- Media type: Print (Hardback)
- Pages: 224
- ISBN: 9780060825324
- OCLC: 924436770

Confessions of a Falling Woman and Other Stories is a 2008 short story collection by Debra Dean. It is a 2009 Paterson Fiction Prize winner, and was on the longlist of the 2008 Florida Book Awards.

== Reception ==
A Guardian review of Confessions of a Falling Woman wrote "While Dean alternates between male and female narrators, there is an uncomfortable sameness." but concluded "...in these controlled, purposeful, slightly mocking stories, Dean vividly illuminates the present too." The Financial Times wrote "She (Dean) knows the frailties and egocentricities of her thespian subjects well - and writes about them with wry eloquence."

Confessions of a Falling Woman has also been reviewed by Publishers Weekly, Kirkus Reviews, Library Journal, and Booklist.
