= The Ice House (St. Petersburg) =

Palace made of ice in Russia

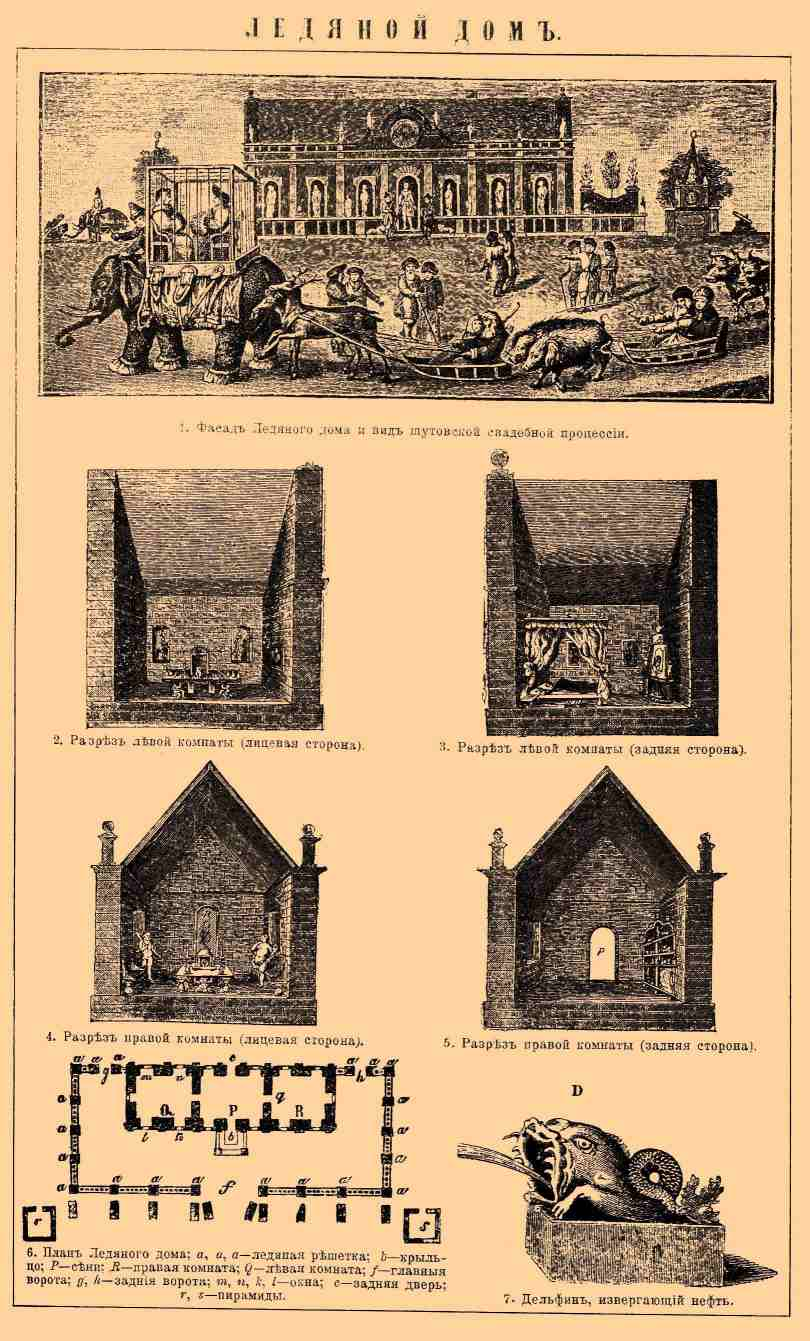
Plan of the ice house St. Petersburg (1740).

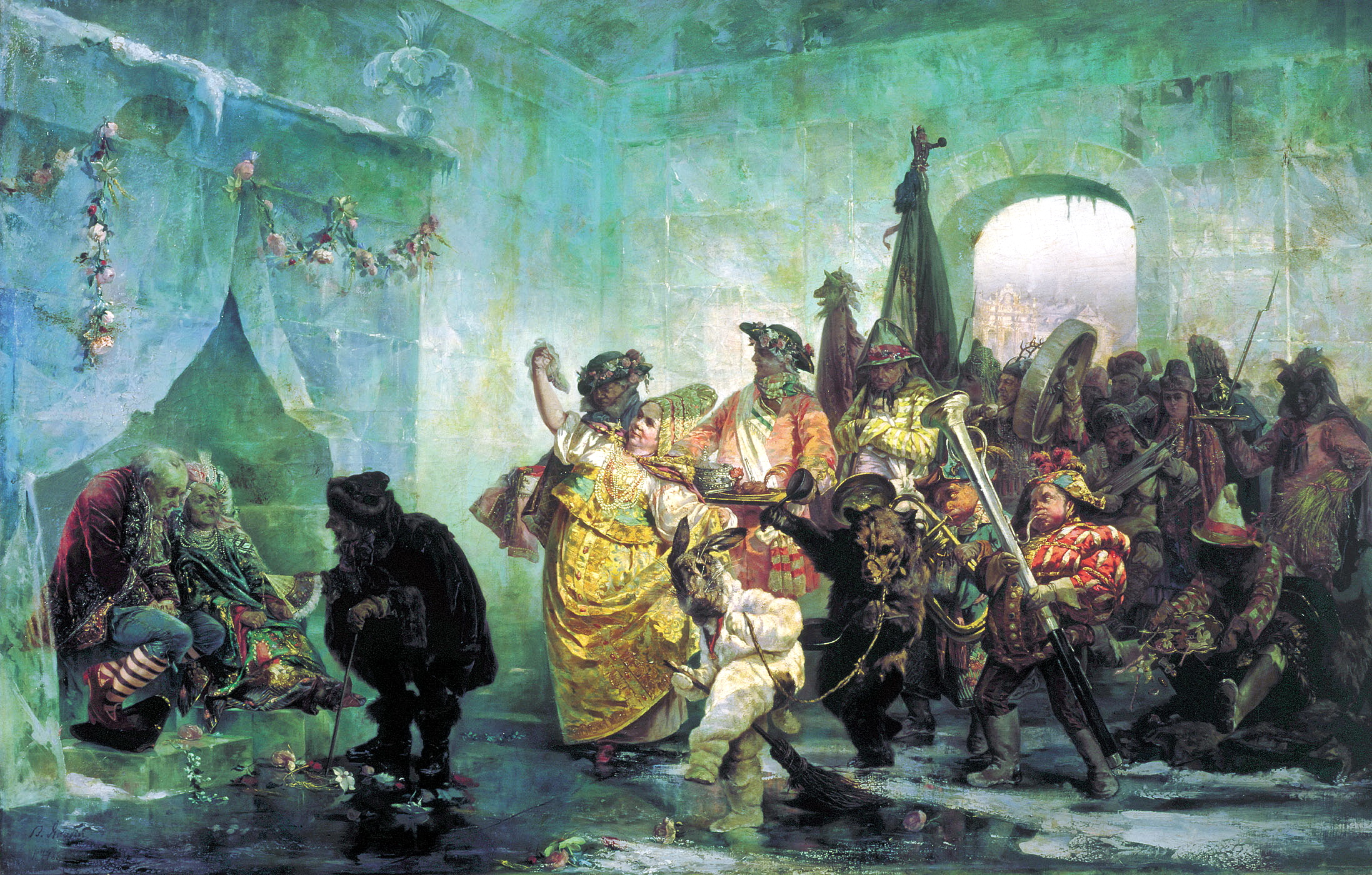
Wedding of the Court Jester in the Ice House (Wedding at the House of Ice ; Valery Jacobi, 1878)

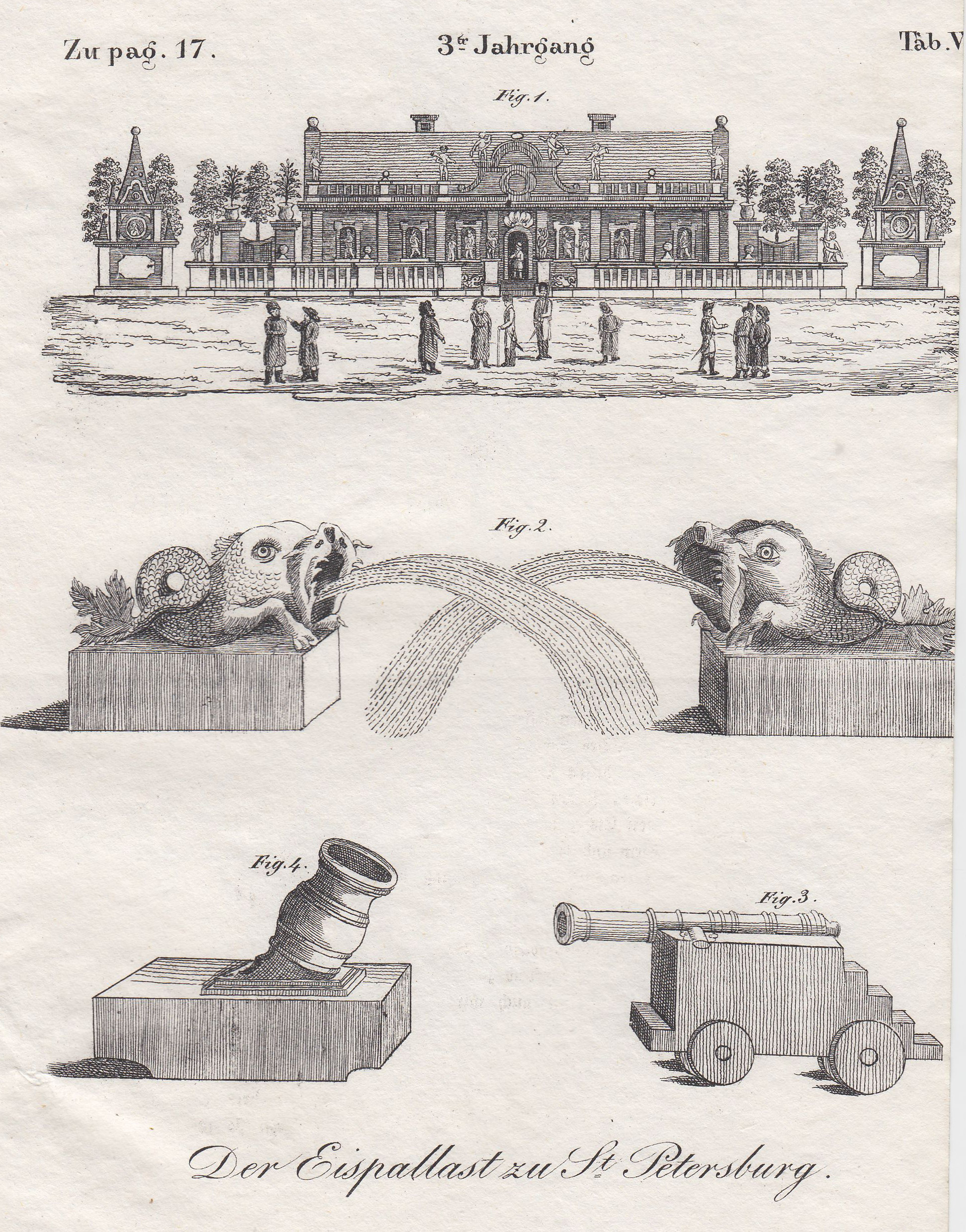
Der Eispallast in St. Petersburg - Figure illustrating a report on the Ice House in as German illustrated popular magazine (1740)

The Ice House (Russian: Ледяной дом) was a palace built of ice in the winter of 1739–40 in Saint Petersburg, Russia. The palace and the surrounding festivities were part of the celebration of Russia's victory over the Ottoman Empire. The Empress Anna Ivanovna ordered Alexis Tatishchev, a court functionary, to construct it on the river Neva between the Admiralty and the Winter Palace during the bitterly cold winter of 1739–40. It was 80 feet long, 33 feet high, and 23 feet deep, and cost 30,000 rubles. By June 1740, the palace had melted into mere blocks of ice floating in the river.

== History ==
Traditionally in very cold winters on the Neva ice installations were built as fortresses for the training of soldiers and for the entertainment of the residents. In the winter of 1739/40 with temperatures of −40 °C, A.D. Tatishchev, general and chief of the St. Petersburg police, initiated the construction of the ice palace. Cabinet Minister Artemy Volynsky issued the idea as his own. Pyotr Yeropkin was involved as an architect and Georg Wolfgang Krafft as an engineer.

The first time the house got too big, the ice surface sagged and water flowed into the house. The new place was chosen between the Winter Palace and the Admiralty, where today the Palace Bridge is located.

The house was 16m long, 5m deep and 6m high; the walls were 3 feet thick on average, built from 120 kg blocks of ice. During construction, they carried out scientific experiments, including attempts at glaciology.

The veranda with carved gables divided the house into two parts. Each part contains two rooms: there was a living room, a dining room, a bedroom and a toilet. Furniture and household items were made of ice. In one of the rooms there were two mirrors, a dressing table, some candlesticks, a large bed, a chair and a fireplace with ice firewood. The second room contained a carved table, two sofas, two armchairs and a small cupboard for a tea service with glasses as well as for wine glasses and dishes. The corners of the room were decorated with two statues of Cupid. Since the ice palace and festivities were part of the celebration of Russia's victory over the Ottoman Empire to the right of the house stood a life-size elephant and a group of Persians made of ice. Two mortars and six six-pound ice cannons were posted near the entrance. They survived the attempt to fire them with four ounces of powder without damage.

The Russian tsarina Anna of Russia gave, from January 27 to February 17, 1740, "various celebrations in this magic castle for the giants of her court", each more splendid than the previous one. The first balls were reminiscent of the Venetian carnival. For entertainment the human zoo of about 300 people of various nations, dressed in national costumes and playing musical instruments, were brought in. The highlight was the "Wedding" of tsarina’s jester, Prince Golitsyn, Mikhail Alekseevich, on February 6 (17), 1740. Avdotja Buscheninowa, a Christian Kalmyk, had complained to Anna about her loneliness. As punishment for Golitsyn secretly marring an Italian and accepting the Catholic faith, Anna had made Golitsyn a court jester and forced him to marry this "girl of the lowest ethnic class." After the church wedding, the bride and groom were placed in a large cage carried by an elephant and accompanied by over 400 people; some of whom rode camels and some sledged by reindeer, pigs, dogs, goats, and cats. The wedding bridal bed was, of course, also made of ice. On the orders of the Tsarina, the couple had to spend all night in it.

The house melted in April 1740.

== Legacy ==
A replica of the ice house was built in 1888. The events were reflected in Ivan Lazhechnikov's novella The Ice House (1835). The novel was made into a film in 1927. Several other literary works depict The Ice House - Yuri Nagibin's story Kwasnik i Buscheninowa (1986). Debra Dean's novel The Mirrored World (2012) to name a few.
