= Ice palace =

Palace-like building, made out of ice

An ice palace or ice castle is a castle-like structure made of blocks of ice. These blocks are usually harvested from nearby rivers or lakes when they become frozen in winter. The first known ice palace (or, rather, ice house, ледяной дом in Russian) appeared in St. Petersburg, Russia, when Anna Ivanovna, Empress of Russia, commissioned an ice palace in St. Petersburg, Russia, during the winter of 1739–40. Architect Piotr Eropkin and scientist Georg Wolfgang Krafft used huge ice blocks measuring 16 m (52 ft) long by 5 m (16 ft) wide, joined together with frozen water, to build the palace. The city recreates the ice palace every winter.

== Anna Ivanovna's palace ==
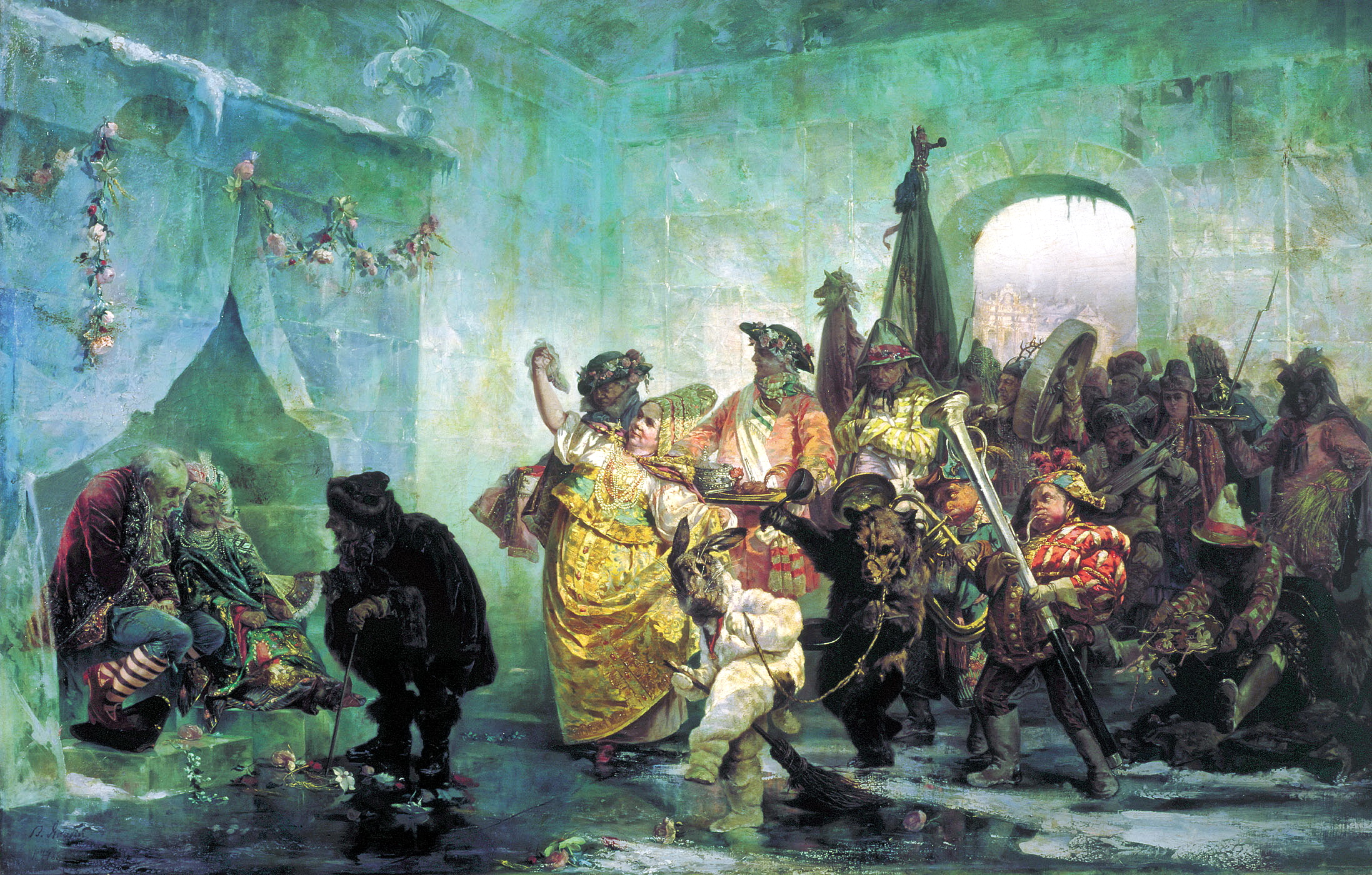
In this 1878 painting by Valery Jacobi, the scared newly-weds sit on the icy bed to the left; the jocular woman in golden dress is Empress Anna herself.

In the cold winter of 1739–1740, Anna Ivanovna gave an order to build a palace made of ice in St. Petersburg. The palace and the surrounding festivities were part of the celebration of Russia's victory over the Ottoman Empire. She ordered the architect Pyotr Yeropkin to design the building. It was built under the supervision of Georg Krafft who left a detailed description of the palace.

The palace was 20 meters tall and 50 meters wide. Huge ice blocks were "glued" together with water. The garden was filled with ice trees with ice birds and an ice statue of an elephant. The outer walls were lined with ice sculptures. Before the palace there were artillery pieces also made of ice. The palace was also furnished with furniture made of ice, including an ice bed with ice mattress and pillows. The whole structure was surrounded with a tall wooden fence.

The festivities involving the Ice Palace included a mock wedding of two jesters. Prince Mikhail Alekseevich Golitsyn had married an Italian woman. Empress Anna saw this as an affront because she was a Catholic, not Eastern Orthodox. The wife died soon after but Anna did not forgive Galitzine and decided to punish him in an unusual manner. She first ordered him to become a jester.

The Empress selected prince Galitzine a new wife, an unattractive Kalmyk maidservant Avdotya Ivanovna Buzheninova. She forced the prince to marry her and displayed the newlyweds in a procession where they rode an elephant, dressed as clowns, and were followed by a number of circus freaks and farm animals. In the palace the newlyweds were closed naked into an icy nuptial chamber under heavy guard. The couple survived the night because the bride traded a pearl necklace with one of the guards for a sheepskin coat.

Empress Anna died the following year and the castle did not survive the next summer. The Russian reading public was made aware of Anna's mock palace in 1835, when Ivan Lazhechnikov (1792–1869) described her escapade in The Ice House, one of the first historical novels in the language. The novel was made into a film as early as 1927. The Mirrored World (2012), a novel by the author of The Madonnas of Leningrad, also depicts this episode in history.

== Other ice palaces ==
Many ice palaces have been built since. In North America, one was built in Montreal, Quebec, Canada in 1883.

Eagle River, Wisconsin, has constructed an ice castle most years going back to the late 1920s.

The capital city of Minnesota, St. Paul, has played host to several ice palaces since 1886 as part of the city's Winter Carnival. Some palaces have featured ice blocks numbering in the tens of thousands. A 1992 structure had 25,000 and stretched to a height of 150 feet (45.7 m). One built in 1941 had 30,000 ice blocks. St. Paul last built an ice palace in January 2018.

Every year since 1954 the Quebec City Winter Carnival in Quebec City has featured ice palaces or ice castles of various sizes, depending on the budget, and has often used them to imprison briefly those persons who were judged to be too glum in this time of good cheer.

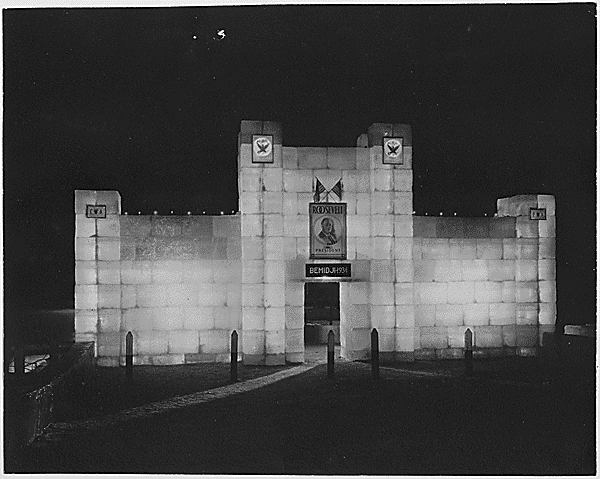
Civil Works Administration: "The Indian New Deal Ice Palace", Lake Bemidji, Minnesota--1934

Saranac Lake, New York has an annual winter carnival in which an ice palace is built. This tradition dates back to 1897, when it was initiated to raise the spirits of tuberculosis patients who came to the town for recuperation over the long winter.

Saparmurat Niyazov, the former president of Turkmenistan, ordered the construction of a huge ice palace near the capital city of Aşgabat in April 2004.

Although the appearance of the original ice palace is disputable, it has been rebuilt each year since 2005 in Saint-Petersburg, Russia and is open to the public.

In 1895, the mining town of Leadville, Colorado, was in an economic slump, due to the depletion of gold and silver ores, and the Panic of 1893. The townspeople were looking for a way to increase tourism in the area, and hit upon the idea of a giant ice castle. City leaders financed the endeavor, and the structure was completed in December of that year. It was opened to the public New Year's Day, 1896, and was an immediate sensation. It was huge. Gleaming blue-white walls three feet thick surrounded an ice skating rink, restaurants, ballrooms, a merry-go-round, and a toboggan slide. Thousands of tourists came to Leadville to see the frozen castle. Special trains brought visitors up the mountains of Colorado, and word spread rapidly around the country. The colossal structure was built on a site roughly five acres in size, on the west side of Harrison Avenue, using almost 5 tons of ice. Boiling water was poured over this, which quickly froze, thus strengthening the walls even further.

The Ice Palace remained open for only three months, and it was not a financial success. An early spring thaw ensured that the structure would not last but a short time. Because of the fact it did not pull in much money, the Leadville city council decided not to rebuild the following winter. Periodically, there has been a resurgence of interest in building another Ice Palace, but nothing has ever come of it. The original site has since been built up with houses.

There have been modern developments in ice construction, including the now widespread use of snice as a mortar-alternative, instead of the more simple, but less reliable, use of water alone.

== In popular culture ==
- In the 1920 short story "The Ice Palace" by F. Scott Fitzgerald, the protagonist, Sally Carrol, visits a recreation of the 1886-1887 St. Paul ice palace in the early 20th century.
- In the 2002 James Bond film Die Another Day, villain Gustav Graves has built a massive ice palace in Iceland for a demonstration to the world media. He later melts it with a solar beam from his "Icarus" satellite.
- In the 2013 animated Disney film Frozen, Queen Elsa builds herself an ice palace using her ice powers. It is later partially destroyed after she is captured by Prince Hans' men. It reappears in the short sequel, Frozen Fever and the film's sequel, Frozen II.

== See also ==
- Ice hotel
- Palacio de Sal – Spanish for "palace of salt", it is a hotel built of salt blocks
