= Palacio de Sal =

Hotel built of salt blocks in Bolivia

Coordinates: 20°19′50.48″S 67°2′48.81″W

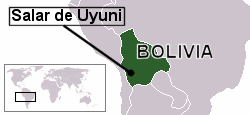
Location of Salar de Uyuni

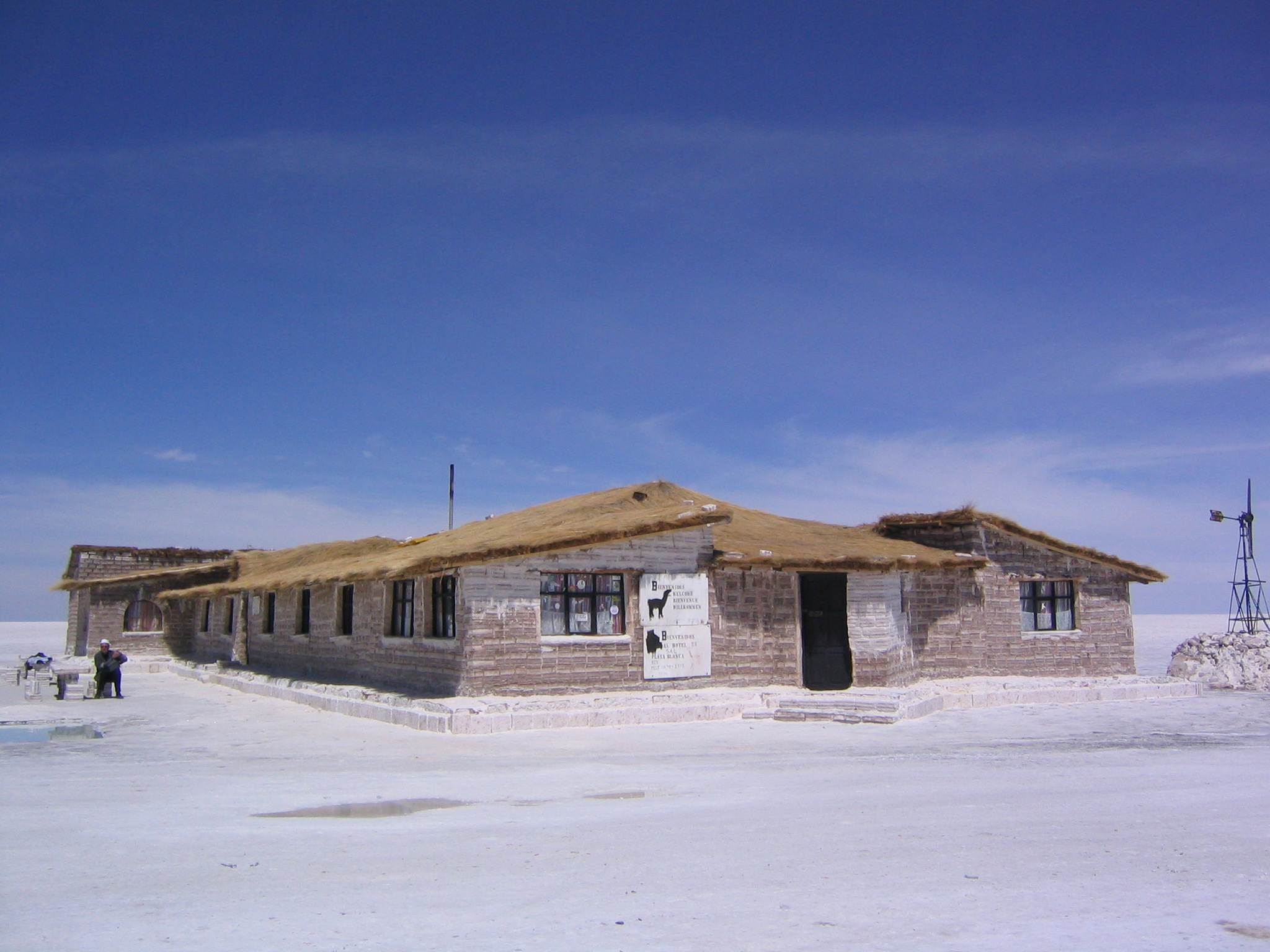

Palacio de Sal (Spanish for "Palace of salt") is a hotel built of salt blocks. It is located at the edge of Salar de Uyuni, the world's largest salt flat, 350 km (220 mi; 190 nmi) south of the La Paz department's capital La Paz.

Salar de Uyuni is the world's largest salt flat at 10,582 km^{2} (4,086 sq mi). It is located in the Potosí and Oruro departments in southwest Bolivia, near the crest of the Andes at an altitude of 3,656 meters (11,995 feet). Salar de Uyuni has long attracted tourists, who came great distances and needed a place to rest before returning to their cities. Building such a resting place required construction materials, which are scarce in the area. Therefore, it was logical to erect a hotel made of salt, which is in ready supply at Salar de Uyuni.

The first hotel was built in 1993–1995 out of salt blocks in the middle of the Salar de Uyuni, and soon became a popular tourist destination. It had 12 double rooms, a common bathroom, and no shower. Its location in the center of a desert produced sanitary problems, as most waste had to be collected manually. Mismanagement caused serious environmental pollution and the hotel had to be dismantled in 2002.

Around 2007, a new hotel was built, under the name Palacio de Sal, in a new location at the eastern edge of Salar de Uyuni, 25 km away from the town of Uyuni. The site is 350 km (220 mi; 190 nmi) south of Bolivia's capital La Paz. The building was constructed of about 1 million 35-cm (14-inch) salt blocks, which are used for the floor, walls, ceiling and furniture, including beds, tables, chairs and sculptures. The sanitary system has been restructured to comply with the government regulations. The hotel has a dry sauna and a steam room, a saltwater pool and whirlpool baths.

In the new hotel, as in the old one, there is a rule prohibiting licking the walls (in order to prevent their degradation).

Wall details	Dining area

== See also ==
- Ice hotel
- Ice palace
