= The Madonnas of Leningrad =

2006 novel by Debra Dean

- Author: Debra Dean
- Language: English
- Genre: Historical fiction
- Published: 2006 (William Morrow)
- Publication place: USA
- Media type: Print (Hardback)
- Pages: 231
- ISBN: 9780060825300
- OCLC: 60589207

The Madonnas of Leningrad, Debra Dean's first novel, tells the story of Marina, a docent at the State Hermitage Museum during the 900-day Siege of Leningrad. Marina's clear and detailed recollections of the Hermitage collection and the war are interspersed with her current dementia-impaired life in Seattle, Washington as she prepares to attend a granddaughter's wedding. The novel uses the vivid memories of the past to contrast with the struggles of an Alzheimer's victim in dealing with everyday life.

== Publication ==
- Debra Dean (2006). The Madonnas of Leningrad. New York: William Morrow. ISBN 0-06-082530-8.

== Reception ==
The Madonnas of Leningrad received mixed reviews. The Guardian wrote "Debra Dean paints a powerful portrait of a woman with Alzheimer's, a disease that makes the past an increasingly persistent intrusion on the present." A review by the Historical Novel Society called it "a beautifully-written novel, a haunting tribute to the power of memory to help us survive in the worst of times." and Ruth Rendell described it as "marvellous". The New York Times observed that "The story is a little too schematic, and Dean's writing a little uneven", but also said that "it largely avoids the sentimentality that mars so much writing about the old and infirm."

The Madonnas of Leningrad has also been reviewed by BookPage, Publishers Weekly, and Kirkus Reviews.
