= Snice =

Intermediate between snow and ice

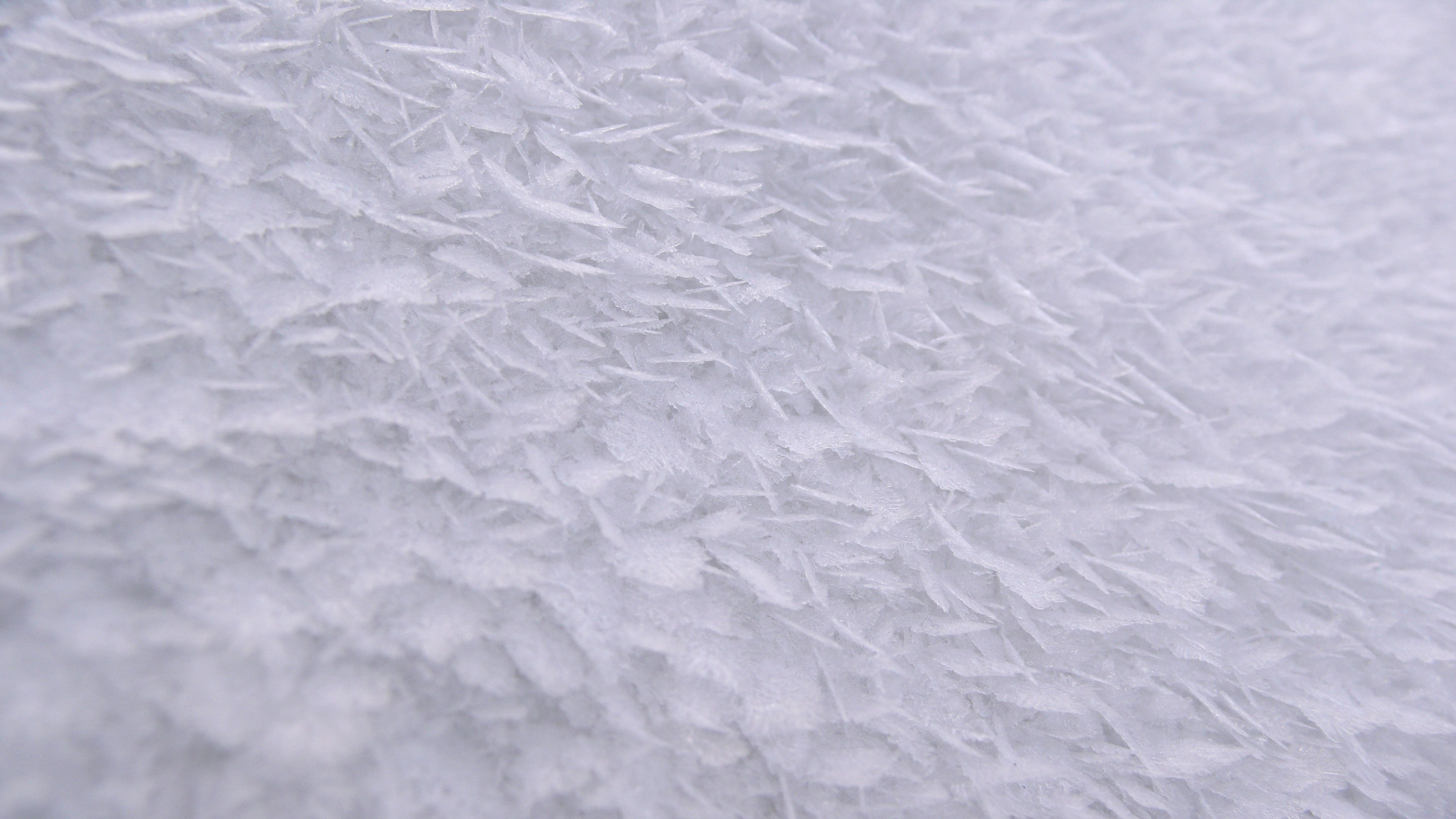
Snice

Snice is a portmanteau of snow and ice. It refers to a type of frozen water whose physical characteristics make it an intermediate between snow and ice: snow-ice. The use of snice, due to its strength, has become normative in modern ice construction, in buildings such as the winter ice hotels constructed annually in certain arctic nations, and the elaborate ice palace constructions, where it forms the bonding between ice blocks, somewhat as mortar does between the bricks of a traditional brick-built structure. It is referred to as snow-ice because it has a snow-like appearance (white, soft, and melts in the mouth), but ice-like physical characteristics.
