= ICIUM =

Winter entertainment park in Levi, Finland

Coordinates: 67°47′09″N 24°48′51″E

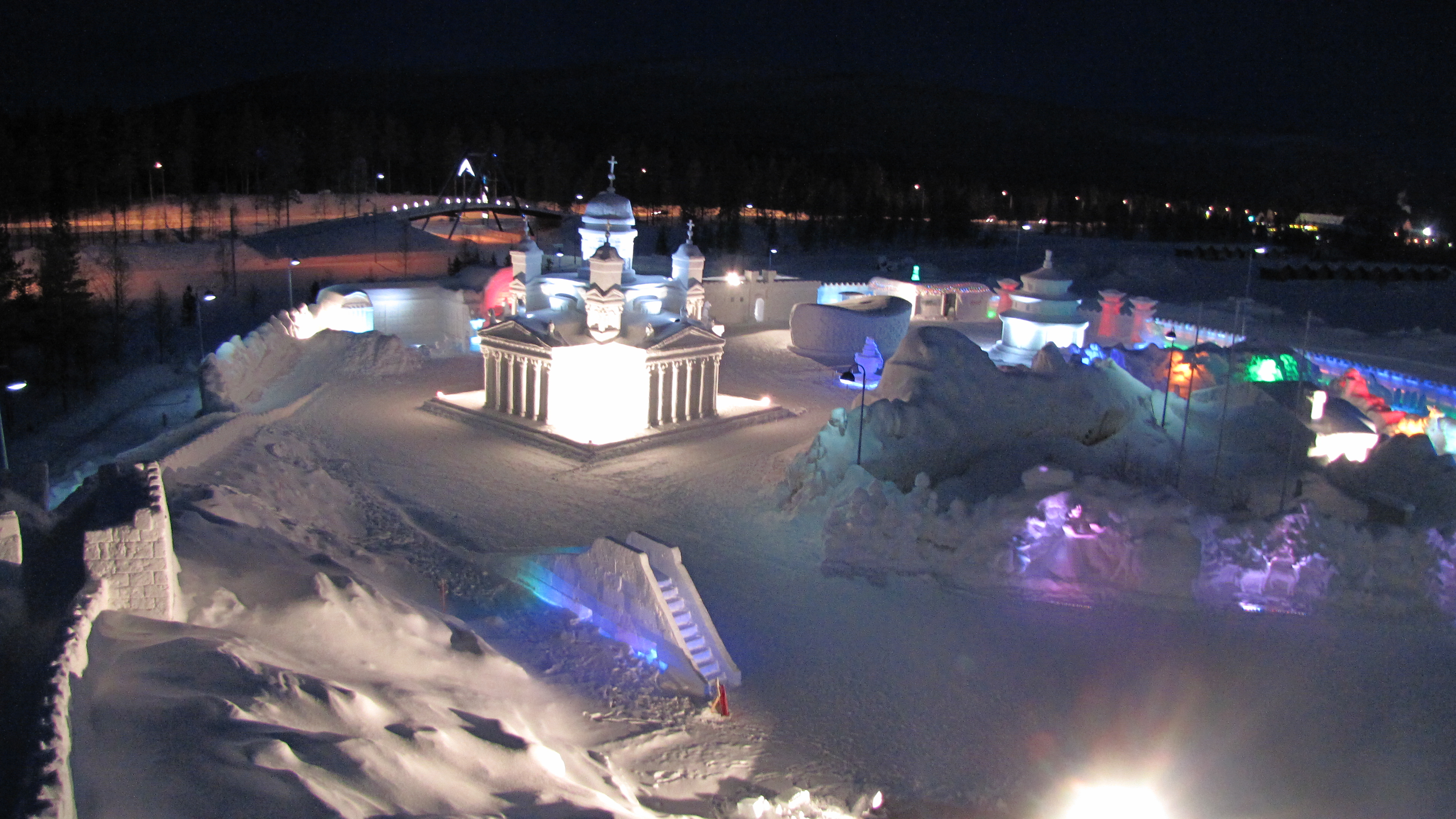
A view from the Great Wall slide towards Helsinki Cathedral in Levi ICIUM 2010-2011

ICIUM Wonderworld of Ice was a winter entertainment park built in Levi, Finland from ice and snow. The first park opened on 18 December 2010, sculptures were also exhibited the following winter. The park showcased both ice sculptures and snow sculptures in an area of about 1 hectare (2.5 acres).

== Construction ==
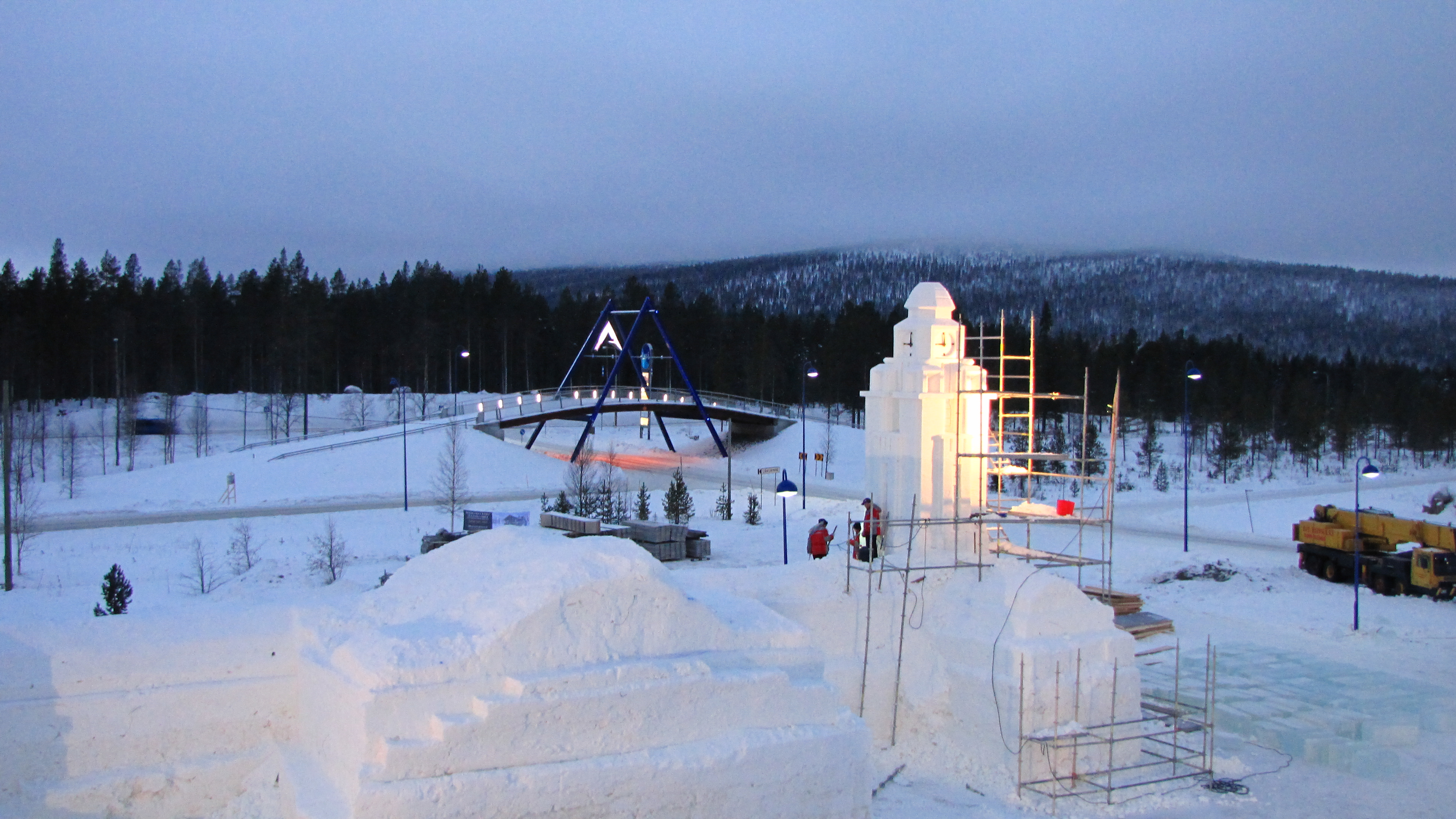
Helsinki Central Railway station under construction in December 2010

ICIUM was built by Chinese ice sculptors from Harbin city, where the annual Harbin International Ice and Snow Sculpture Festival has been held since 1963.

More than 10,000 cubic metres (350,000 cu ft) of snow was used in the construction of the first ICIUM in 2010. The builders also lifted over 600 cubic metres (21,000 cu ft) of ice from the Ounasjoki river to make the sculptures.

Folk artists from Beijing were also in ICIUM to show how to make traditional Chinese folk arts such as straw weaving, snuff bottle painting and dough sculpting.

== Structures in ICIUM ==
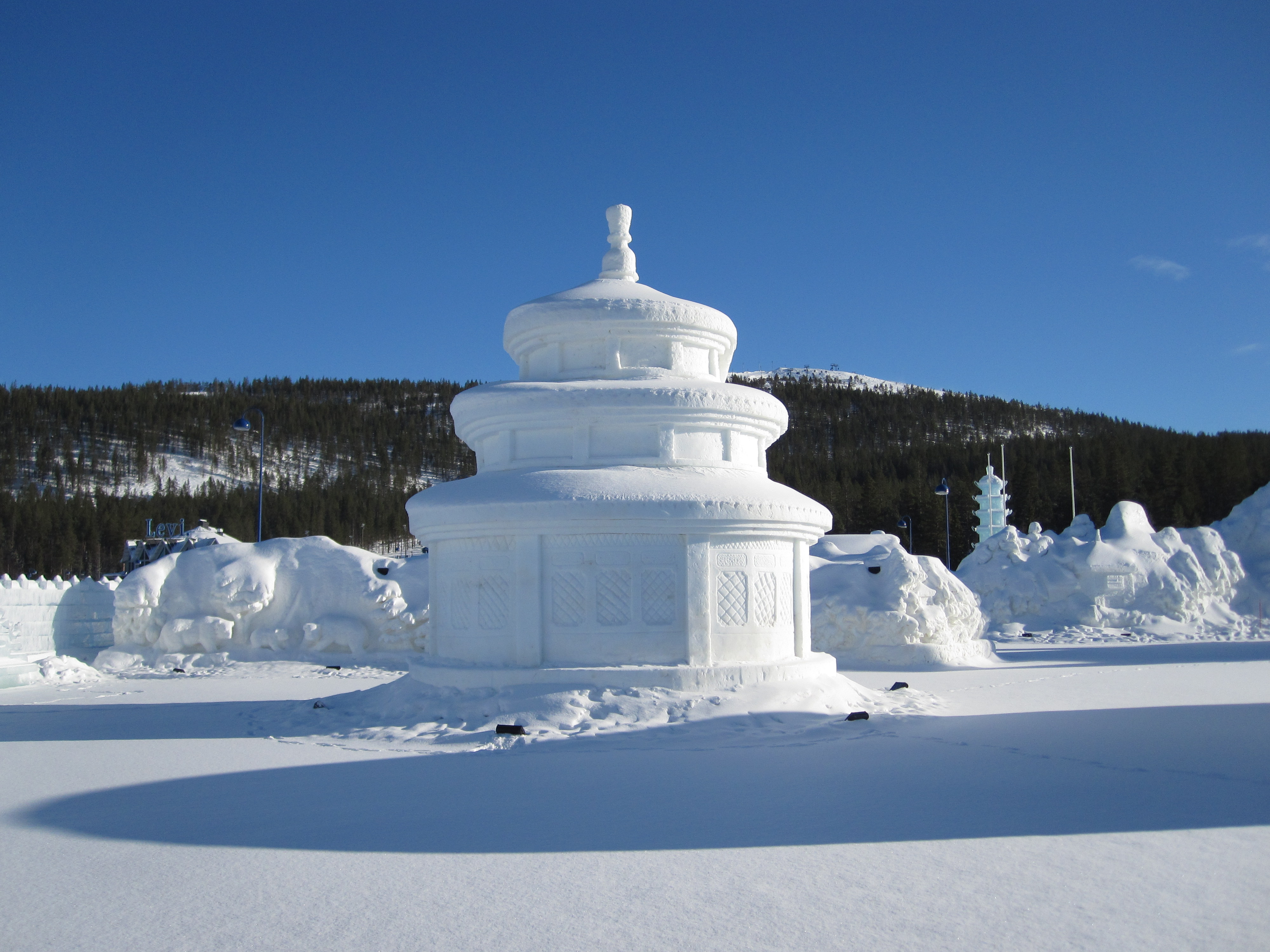
Temple of Heaven

The main attractions in ICIUM season 2010–2011 were:

- Great Wall of China slide. The biggest snow building, the Great Wall slide was 15 metres (49 ft) high and 80 metres (260 ft) long. More than 5,000 cubic metres (180,000 cu ft) of snow went into its construction.
- Helsinki Cathedral. At 15 metres (49 ft) high, the Helsinki Cathedral, along with the Great Wall slide, was the tallest snow buildings in ICIUM.
- Helsinki Central railway station.
- Pagoda. The green pagoda was the tallest ice sculpture in ICIUM, at over 15 metres high.
- Temple of Heaven.
- Beijing National Stadium.
- Terracotta Army. Ice sculptures of terracotta soldiers.
