= Ice Palace (1985 video game) =

- Developer: Aackosoft
- Publisher: Creative Sparks
- Designer: Paul Norris
- Platform: Commodore 64
- Release: 1985
- Genre: Action-adventure
- Mode: Single-player

Ice Palace is an action-adventure game designed by Paul Norris for the Commodore 64 and published by Creative Sparks in 1985. It is unrelated both to the 1984 Commodore 64 game Ice Palace by K-Tel International and to 1988's Beyond the Ice Palace. The game tells the story of a crown prince's quest to break an evil spell, save his land, and avenge his father. It was mostly well received by critics but failed commercially.

== Gameplay ==
The wicked Ice Queen has murdered the good king and placed the kingdom under a terrible spell of forever winter. The young prince of the now frozen realm ascends to the Ice Palace to collect the scattered and hidden pieces of his father's crown that can be used to vanquish the forces of evil. Once the whole crown is found, the Ice Queen can be destroyed.

The player is required to navigate through a honeycomb like maze and find the seven pieces of the golden crown, whilst fighting off enemies and avoiding traps. With each piece of the crown found, the player is taken to the next level. During an encounter, the player must use verbal commands to find the crown pieces. The player has limited time to find the whole crown before the holy candle melts and the game's good-and-evil meter degrades to evil.

== Development ==
The game's author Paul Norris later said "the pursuit of technical excellence in a game can be a waste of time" as "technical brilliance is all well and good... but the most important lesson that I have learnt is never to lose sight of the final product." Crash reported Norris "reached this conclusion after spending far too much time developing a superior scrolling routine for Ice Palace when a simple page scroll would not have detracted significantly from the overall effect of the complete game." Norris later created a similarly themed game titled Wicked. Ice Palace was re-released in 1986 as a budget title.

== Reception ==
Ice Palace was mostly received positively by gaming press, It was awarded four out of five stars from Computer Gamer. Other review scores included 32/40 from Computer and Video Games, who noted its "good" graphics, "excellent" sound, and "totally addictive" gameplay, and 72% from Zzap!. However, Your Commodore opined that "while being quite appealing, the game was on the whole tedious." According to Computer Gamer, this "excellent" game "appeared to be ahead of its time and didn't do particularly well" upon its original release.
