= Debra Dean =

American writer

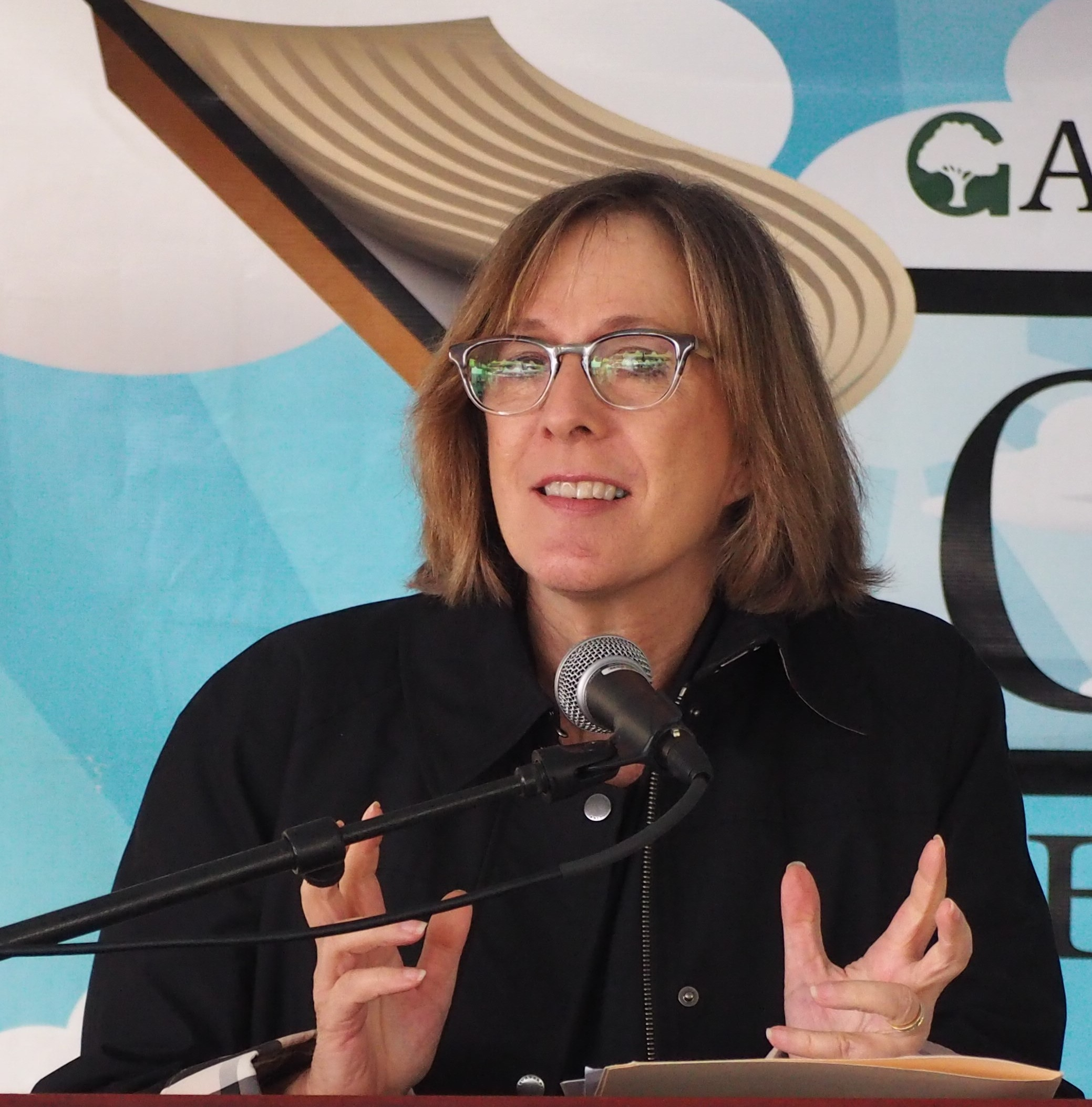
- Writing career
- Genres: novel, non-fiction

Debra Lynn Dean (born 1957) is an American writer, best known for her 2006 novel, The Madonnas of Leningrad.

== Life ==
Dean was born and brought up in Seattle and studied English and Drama at Whitman College, graduating in 1980. She then trained as an actress in New York City, where she married another actor, and worked mostly in theatre until returning to the Pacific Northwest to study for a Master of Fine Arts at the University of Oregon. She now teaches creative writing at the Florida International University, where she is an associate professor of English.

== Works ==
- The Madonnas of Leningrad (New York: William Morrow, 2006, ISBN 9780060825300, OCLC 780026459)
- Confessions of a Falling Woman (New York: HarperCollins, 2008, ISBN 9780060825324, OCLC 924436770)
- The Mirrored World (New York: Harper Perennial, 2013, ISBN 9780061231469, OCLC 813286531)
- Hidden Tapestry: Jan Yoors, His Two Wives, and the War That Made Them One (Evanston, Illinois: Northwestern University Press, 2018, ISBN 9780810136830, OCLC 1004512034)
