= The Mirrored World =

2012 novel by Debra Dean

- Author: Debra Dean
- Language: English
- Genre: Historical fiction
- Published: 2012 (HarperCollins)
- Publication place: USA
- Media type: Print (Hardback)
- Pages: 245
- ISBN: 9780061231452
- OCLC: 777621233

The Mirrored World is a 2012 novel by Debra Dean that presets a fictionalized account of Xenia of Saint Petersburg.

== Reception ==
In a review for The Seattle Times, Wingate Packard wrote "In her excellent second novel, "The Mirrored World," Debra Dean has composed a resonant and compelling tale from 18th-century Russia, based on the historically true story of Xenia, later Saint Xenia of St. Petersburg." The Daily Reporter called it ""a brilliant look at the underbelly of societal expectation".

The Mirrored World has also been reviewed by Library Journal, Booklist, BookPage, Publishers Weekly, the Historical Novel Society, Missoulian, and Kirkus Reviews.
