= Argyle =

Argyle may refer to:

== Places ==
=== Australia ===
- Argyle, Victoria
- Argyle County, New South Wales
  - Electoral district of Argyle, defunct
  - Electoral district of County of Argyle, defunct
- Argyle, Western Australia
- Argyle diamond mine, Western Australia
- Lake Argyle, in Western Australia

=== Canada ===
- Argyle, Manitoba
- Rural Municipality of Argyle, Manitoba
- Municipality of the District of Argyle, Nova Scotia
  - Argyle (electoral district)
- Argyle, Guysborough County, Nova Scotia
- Argyle, Ontario
- Argyle, London, Ontario
- Rural Municipality of Argyle No. 1, Saskatchewan

=== United Kingdom ===
- Argyll, Scotland, archaic spelling Argyle

=== United States ===
- Argyle, Florida
- Argyle, Georgia
- Argyle, Illinois
- Argyle, Iowa
- Argyle, Kentucky
- Argyle (Houma, Louisiana), a historic house
- Argyle, Maine
- Argyle Township, Michigan
- Argyle, Minnesota
- Argyle, Missouri
- Argyle (town), New York
  - Argyle (village), New York
- Argyle, Texas
- Argyle, Utah, a ghost town
- Argyle, Washington
- Argyle, West Virginia
- Argyle (town), Wisconsin
  - Argyle (village), Wisconsin
- Argyle Island, a river island in Georgia

== Arts and entertainment ==
=== Fictional characters ===
- Argyle, in the film Die Hard
- Argyle, in Stranger Things
- Argyle, in Star Trek
- Sai Argyle, in Mobile Suit Gundam SEED

=== Music ===
- "Argyle", a song by The Bouncing Souls from the 1996 album Maniacal Laughter
  - The Argyle E.P., 1993

== Schools ==
- Argyle Independent School District, in Argyle, Texas, United States
  - Argyle High School
- Argyle Middle School, Silver Spring, Maryland, United States
- Argyle Secondary School, British Columbia, Canada

== Transportation ==
- Argyle, former name of Mong Kok station, Argyle Street, Hong Kong
- Argyle station (CTA), in Chicago, United States
- Argyle Line, a suburban railway in West Central Scotland
- Argyle railway station, New South Wales, Australia
- Argyle (1807 ship)
- MV Argyle, a Scottish ferry
- Argyle Airport (disambiguation)

== Other uses ==
- Argyle (surname), including a list of people with the name
- Argyle (pattern), made of diamonds or lozenges
- Argyle Hotel Group
- The Argyle, now Sunset Tower, a hotel in West Hollywood, United States
- Argyle Theatre, in Birkenhead, England

== See also ==
- Argle (disambiguation)
- Argyle Building (disambiguation)
- Argyle House (disambiguation)
- Argyle station (disambiguation)
- Argyle Street (disambiguation)
- Argyll (disambiguation)
- Argyll and Bute, a council area in Scotland
- Argylle, a 2024 spy comedy film
- Argile (disambiguation)
- Argo (disambiguation)
- Argyle Shore Provincial Park, Prince Edward Island, Canada
- Argyle-Kendal, town in Tobago
- Hearst-Argyle Television, an American television station group majority-owned by the Hearst Corporation
- Plymouth Argyle F.C., an English football team
- The Argyle Sweater, an American daily comic strip
