= Argle =

Argle or Argles may refer to:

- Argle, a surname, variant of Orgill
- Argle, a fictional character in works of Margot Pardoe
- Argles, surname

== See also ==
- Argleton
- Argyle (disambiguation)
- Argile (disambiguation)
- Argyll (disambiguation)
