= Argyle House =

Argyle House may refer to:

- Argyle House, Albany, a heritage-listed house in Western Australia
- Argyle House, Edinburgh, a 1960s office development in Scotland
- Argyle House, Millers Point, a heritage-listed house in Sydney, New South Wales, Australia
- Argyle House, Newcastle, a heritage-listed house in New South Wales, Australia
- Argyle House School, a school in England

== See also ==
- Argyll House, a historic property in London
- Argyll House (Chelsea) a historic property in Chelsea, London
