= Argles =

Argles is a surname, and may refer to:

- Jean Argles (1925–2023), British World War II code breaker
- Marsham Argles (1814–1892), Anglican clergyman
- Harold Arthur Argles (1899–1929), member, personnel of the Shackleton–Rowett Expedition
- Frank Atkinson Argles (fl. 1872), High Sheriff of Westmorland
- Theodore Argles (1851–1886), Australian journalist
- Thomas Atkinson Argles (1859–1923), High Sheriff of Westmorland

== See also ==
- Argle (disambiguation)
