= Argyle House, Millers Point =

Argyle House
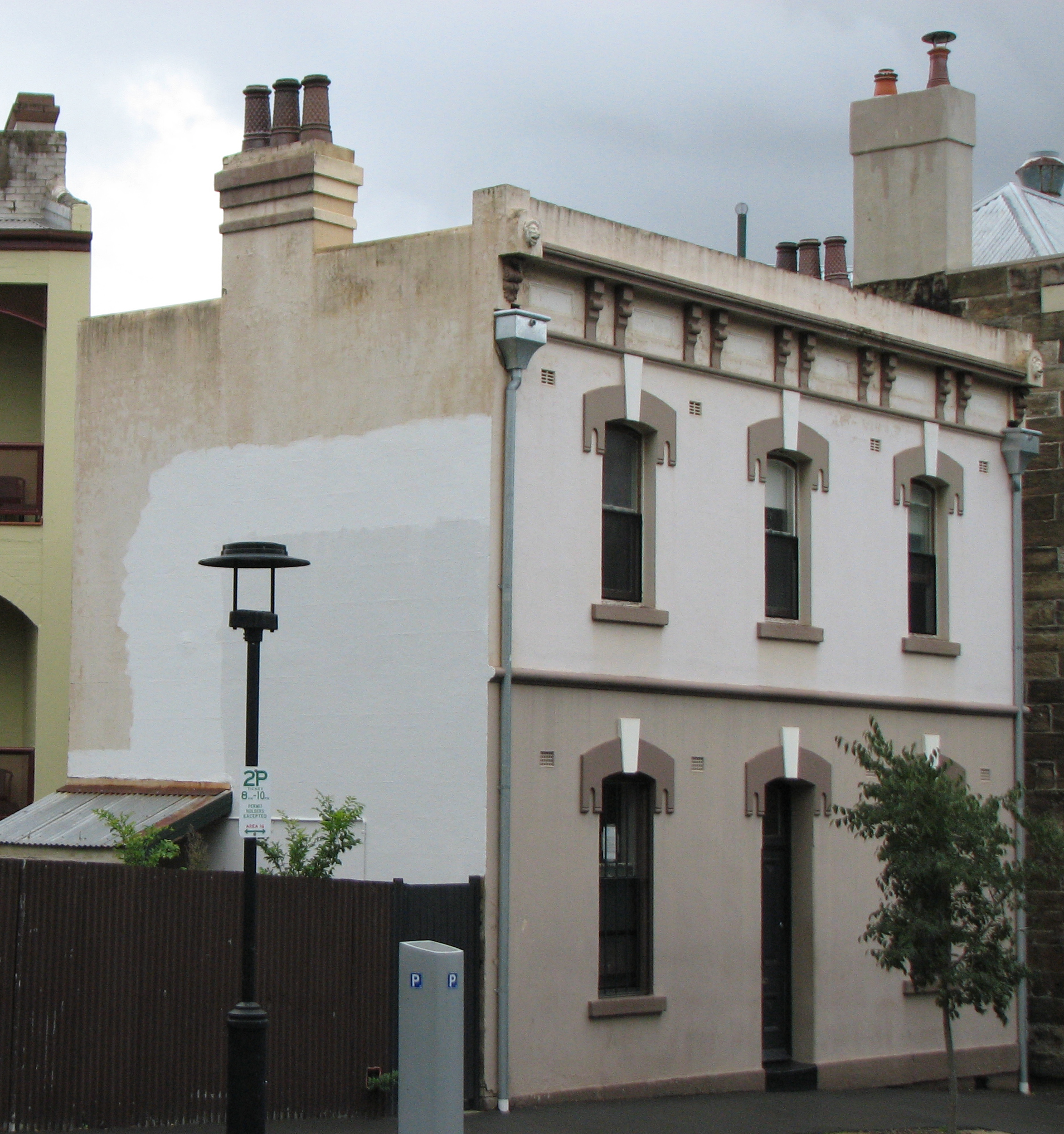
- Argyle House, 85 Lower Fort Street, Millers Point, New South Wales

- Location within Sydney Location within Australia
- 33.8579°S 151.2057°E
- Location: 85 Lower Fort Street, Millers Point, City of Sydney, New South Wales, Australia

New South Wales Heritage Register
- Official name: Argyle House
- Type: State heritage (built)
- Designated: 2 April 1999
- Reference no.: 838
- Type: House
- Category: Residential buildings (private)

Argyle House is a heritage-listed residence located at 85 Lower Fort Street, in the inner city Sydney suburb of Millers Point in the City of Sydney local government area of New South Wales, Australia. The property was added to the New South Wales State Heritage Register on 2 April 1999.

== History ==
The following historical overview has been summarised from the Draft Conservation Management Plan for the property at 85 Lower Fort Street, prepared by NBRS + Partners and dated 29 January 2016.

On 20 November 1830, David Leighton sold a parcel of land at Millers Point to John Clarke. Leighton was the son of prominent Sydneysider John Leighton, or "Jack the Miller" who had erected several windmills in the area and had given the Point its name. Clarke paid £37 for the land which was described as being bounded on the north-west by Windmill Street, on the south-east by the road to Dawes Battery (i.e. Lower Fort Street), on the south-west by Henry McGee, and on the north-east by government land.

Clark fenced his land, in accordance with Government policy but subsequently came into conflict with the government as this parcel of land had originally been set aside for government purposes. The Director of Public Works wrote to Clarke in May 1831 requesting that he remove the fencing. Clarke took his case to the Colonial Secretary, setting out the details of the purchase for which had he paid a considerable sum of money. James Brindley Bettington, a notable merchant of Millers Point, endorsed Clarke's memorial. The original vendor, Leighton, claimed that he had purchased the land from Patrick Marmount, who had been granted the land by Governor Macquarie in compensation for some land he held which had been resumed for the government windmill.

=== Original structure ===
Clarke was successful in his case and was permitted to retain the land which he had purchased in good faith. Governor Darling specified that the land be divided by Town Surveyor, Ambrose Hallen, between Clarke and Lucas, an adjacent purchaser in a similar predicament. Shortly thereafter, Clarke erected a building on his land. On 27 June 1833 he was granted a Publican 's Licence for the Shipwrights Arms Inn in Windmill Street (this building is 75 Windmill Street).

John Clarke died on 20 July 1838 and left his estate to be divided amongst his five sons. The eldest son, also named John Clarke, applied for a deed of grant for the land on 6 December 1839. The land was subsequently granted on 18 June 1840 to John Clarke, of the North Shore, Sydney. The land was described as measuring "13 perches situated in the Town of Sydney Parish of St Philip County of Cumberland - Allotment No. One of Section No. Ninety Four". Simultaneously John Clarke sold the comer portion of the allotment to George Paton for £350. On that site Paton erected the Hero of Waterloo Hotel, which was licensed in 1845.

On the 7 February 1844, John Clarke conveyed a portion of the allotment to his brother William Clarke of Hunters Hill, cabinet maker, for the token sum of £0/10/0. William Clarke died on the 23 March 1868 and bequeathed his estate to his wife Charlotte. She subsequently found it necessary to sell the land and contracted with James Brierley of Sydney, carpenter and joiner, to sell the land for the sum of £200. In 1876, Brierley conveyed that portion of allotment no. one to Samuel Bridgement of Sydney, landowner, for £210.

In May 1880, Bridgement sold the land, comprising allotment 2 and part of allotment 1 of section 94, to George Minton of York Street, gentleman, for the substantial sum of £1,700/18/0. This irregularly shaped block had two frontages, Windmill Street and Lower Fort Street. The Windmill Street portion of the property was occupied by the Live and Let Live Hotel, also known as the Central Hotel in 1884–1895, and being the former house and blacksmith's shop of John McMillan.

The block plan accompanying Old System Deed Bk 202 No. 960, depicting Allotment No. 2 and part of Allotment No of City Section 94 is shown hereunder. Outlined on this plan is a building on the subject site fronting Lower Fort Street which is possibly the blacksmith's workshop at the rear of adjoining McMillan's house erected between 1839 and 1841 (site of the Stevens Building at 73A Windmill Street) or it could be detached buildings at the rear of the former Shipwright Arms Hotel (75 Windmill Street) erected by John Clarke in 1840/41.

An 1880 survey of the site shows this building as a single storey stone structure with a verandah adjoining the yards belonging to the Hero of Waterloo Hotel and then numbered 65 Windmill Street. The single storey brick building on the subject site was demolished in 1882 as an auction sale was held on the ground on 15 July, "opposite Trinity Church" of "the whole of the materials contained in the house No. 85 Lower Fort Street". Immediately prior to demolition the Sands Directory names August Ollenburg at this address in 1882, preceded in 1879–1880 by "Henry Hillyer, blacksmith" at 75 or 77 Lower Fort Street. According to the 1880 City of Sydney Assessment Listing, Hillyer was named as the ratepayer at 85 Lower Fort Street in conjunction with "T Bridgeman" (owner) of a house of brick & stone and shingled of two floors and four rooms. The same building is listing in the 1877 Assessment Book in the occupation of Theodore Cavanagh and owned by Samuel Bridgment. It is not possible to confirm occupancy of the building in Lower Fort Street prior to 1877 as the Dands Directory is a highly unreliable source.

Irrespective of the previous history of the earlier building on the subject site, it is clear from the evidence presented that the house was demolished in mid-1882 and Minton commissioned the construction of a new house on the subject land soon after.

=== Current housing structure ===
The first reference to the new house (the present building) is in the 1885 Sands Directory when "Evan Evans' boarding house" is listed at 85 Lower Fort Street. Three years later in 1888 a marriage announcement appeared in The Sydney Morning Herald on 17 September for the wedding of William Irvine to "Annie Elizabeth, eldest daughter of Evan Evans, of 85 Lower Fort Street, Sydney."

Following Minton 's death on 14 January 1890, probate of the will was granted on 27 April 1890 to his Trustees, Samuel Charles Dennis and Robert Henry Mathers, to be held in trust for David Glassford B. Clyne, Archibald Clyne and Maria Gordon Clyne. Minton's estate comprised three freehold properties (two situated at Millers Point and one at Ashfield), "money in bank" and "personal effects" and was valued at a total of £4,665/10/8. The subject site "situated on the western side of Lower Fort Street...[with] a frontage to said street of 40 feet by an average depth of 26 feet...[on which] is erected a dwelling house of Brick on Stone, Slate roof containing 6 rooms and Bathroom etc at a rental of 30/- per week" was valued at £900.

On 16 May 1897, Minton's Trustees contracted with Kathleen Mary Stevens, wife of John Michael Stevens of Leichhardt, musician, to sell her the property for £900. Stevens simultaneously raised a mortgage with John T. Neale and converted the property to Torrens title by Primary Application 11340 According to historian Terry Kass, "the presence of an established market at Millers Point for high-class boarding house accommodation appears to have provided the incentive for Kathleen Mary Stevens...to erect the "Stevens Terraces", as a high class boarding house at 73 Windmill Street...completed sometime in 1901, it possessed 8 apartments which were let and rated separately."

Several sources identify Evan Evans as the principal occupant of the subject site in this period, which is referred to as a "boarding house", including the 1891 City of Sydney Assessment Book. The 1891 Census names Evan Evans and William Irvine (his son-in-law) at 85 Lower Fort Street which property was occupied by seven males/two females and one male/two females respectively.

Succeeding Evan Evans as occupant of 85 Lower Fort Street was Alexander Murison who, according to the Sands Sydney and NSW Directory, was the tenant until 1900 when this property was resumed by the State Government and placed in the management of the Sydney Harbour Trust. The subject site was comprised in a larger parcel of land identified on the Plan of Resumption as Item 716 in the ownership of Kathleen M Stevens by Deed Book 600 No 156. 85 Lower Fort Street can clearly be seen in the view of Lower Fort Street from Argyle Street about 1900.

The precipitating factor for the large scale resumption of the privately owned wharves at Darling Harbour and the adjacent residential and commercial precinct in The Rocks and Millers Point "was an outbreak of bubonic plague in Sydney in 1900, with the infection of a van driver, Arthur Payne, who lived next to the wharves, in 10 Ferry Lane, Millers Point, on January 20". The Sydney Harbour Trust took over a total of 803 properties from February to June 1901, including 430 dwellings.

According to Robertson and Hindmarsh, "the land resumed under the Darling Harbour Resumption Act" was divided into two with the immediate waterfront and part of Millers Point vested in the newly created Sydney Harbour Trust. The remainder of the resumed lands became known as The Rocks Resumed Area and the improvements in this area were undertaken by the Public Works Department. Windmill Street was the boundary between the two resumed areas, the buildings on the north side fell within the area managed by the Sydney Harbour Trust, the buildings on the south side...were within the area managed by the Public Works Department" (PWD). The subject property in Lower Fort Street thus fell within the area managed by the PWD.

The 1902 City of Sydney Assessment Listing described the building at 85 Lower Fort Street as brick with an iron roof and comprising three floors and six rooms with an annual value of £47. Michael Brothers was listed as the person rated and John Stevens was identified as the owner/landlord. Prior to 1901 the building had been used as a boarding house. The 1901 Census, however names Brothers as the principal householder and states that 85 Lower Fort Street was occupied by just two males and one female, suggesting a family unit. Brothers lived in the property until 1923.

=== Repurposed as a baby health clinic ===
85 Lower Fort Street was leased to the Department of Public Health and converted to the Millers Point Baby Health Clinic from 1924. A baby health clinic, under the auspices of the Department of Health, was established in Millers Point in 1916 in a small terrace house at Little Essex and Gloucester Streets. The Baby Health Clinic was transferred to 85 Lower Fort Street in 1924. In the interim, operation and management of the baby health centres was transferred to the Division of Maternal and Baby Welfare in 1926. The below figure shows a photograph of construction of steelwork for the Sydney Harbour Bridge in about 1930, and the subject building is identified by signwriting thereon "Milsons Point Baby Health Centre".

Millers Point was neither the busiest nor largest baby health centre but for instance during 1937-1939 staff of the clinic visited 31/38/30 newborn babies, made 277/277/290 subsequent visits to houses of babies, dealt with 1477/1273/1270 total attendances, and served 90/116/120 babies respectively at the centre. From 1930 until 1944 administrative policy for Baby Health Centres stated "that a new Centre could only be established if a local Council or Committee were prepared to provide and maintain the premises and equipment while the Department [of Health] continued to be responsible for the full maintenance of those established before 1930". Millers Point therefore came under the management of the Department of Health as it had been opened prior to 1930. In 1944 a new government policy came into force which stipulated that: "where in future any local organisation of approved status is prepared to co operate in the establishment of a Baby Health Centre for use either in substitution of existing unsatisfactory premises or as a fresh or additional Centre" that organisation or Council would receive a grant of up to 50% of the capital cost of building and equipping the centre, or 25% of the rent payable if it is not possible to erect a new building, or 50% towards the purchase of suitable premises."

The following year the City of Sydney Council approved the preparation of plans for alterations and additions to three Baby Health Centres in the municipality including the subject property in Lower Fort Street. In February 1946 the Council approved plans of alterations and additions to the property at an estimated cost of £674, "subject to suitable arrangements being made with the Minister for Public Works who at present controls the building"; the proposal approved by Council represented an amendment of the proposal submitted by the Director General of Public Health. Council's representation on this matter to the Department of Health, seeking part funding for the work was knocked back as, "if agreed to would represent a departure from the newly established policy of the Government in the direction of giving assistance towards Baby Health Centre projects". Though a minor setback to Council's proposal, the Council approved the original proposal submitted by the Department of Public Health, and "action towards the remodelling of the existing Baby Health Centre at 85 Lower Fort Street is now proceeding."

Following the approval of the plans by the Department of Health, in September 1946 the Council sought and received approval for a lease of the premises (85 Lower Fort Street) from the Minister for Public Works for a period of 10 years. Notwithstanding that the alterations had been approved and the lease negotiated, the project stalled in the immediate post-war period due to building materials shortages; the Department of Building Materials had only allocated 23 square metres (250 ft^{2}) of the statewide allocation of 740 square metres (8,000 ft^{2}) to the City of Sydney for proposed works to baby health centres and preschool units. The Council decided to use that entire quota on the additions to the Millers Point Baby Health Centre and to seek additional funding for other planned projects in the Municipality.

The proposed additions to the subject building did not proceed, and in 1950 Council approached the Department of Public Health for approval to erect a new baby health centre on land adjoining 85 Lower Fort Street (87 Lower Fort Street) for which they had obtained a lease from the Maritime Services Board commencing on 1 October 1950. Construction of the new building commenced after November 1951 when Council accepted the tender of S Bourne for the sum of £4,950.

=== Rename as Argyle House ===
The Millers Point Baby Health Centre transferred to the new premises, adjoining the subject 85 Lower Fort Street, on 20 November 1952. 85 Lower Fort Street was vacated upon the transfer of the Baby Health Centre to the new premises next door at 87 Lower Fort Street. The Maritime Services Board subsequently negotiated a new lease for 85 Lower Fort Street with the Millers Point Old Age and Invalid Pensioners Welfare Fund commencing in January 1953. Coinciding with the lease the building was converted to a hostel for old aged and/or invalid pensioners and renamed "Argyle House".

The property was transferred from the MSB to the Housing Commission of NSW in September 1975 and a new lease was entered into with the Millers Point Old Age and Invalid Pensioners Welfare Fund. Funds raised through the lease were to be utilised for maintenance of the property. A report was prepared in 1982 for repairs and maintenance required at Argyle House totalling some $12,738 but it is not known if this work was carried out as a result.

The NSW Department of Housing offered to carry out essential repairs to the subject building from the 1986/87 budget allocation. The promised funding did not eventuate and in February 1990 the Board wrote to the department requesting their assistance to undertake exterior painting and other listed repairs as the cost of re-roofing, repair of storm water drains and waterproofing of "Argyle House" was "considerably more than the Department's estimation of $900". A note in the Administration File notes that "the Department carried out extensive repairs in 1990/91 although maintenance is the Lessee's responsibility."

The Department of Housing undertook a heritage building assessment of the property in May 2001 at which time it was described as follows:

The condition of this (the property) varies considerably on all three levels. The ground floor is derelict after considerable fire damage. The middle level fronts onto Lower Fort Street and has been recently maintained. The Upper of Third floor has a new bathroom but both bedrooms are well below standard. The carpet and floors are mouldy and stained due to prolonged history of water penetration.

At this time the Darling House Aged Care Association Inc took over the management and financial responsibility for Argyle House.

Following on from a report issued to the Maritime Services Board by the Efficiency Audit Division of Public Services Board, non-port properties were transferred to the Department of Housing. This process commenced in late 1982 and transfer of properties was staged between 1983 and 1986. The change in landlord was not popular with the then residents, who were concerned with the placement of outsiders into vacant hou ses. The concern was that, without connections to maritime industry the new residents would erode the social cohesiveness of the area. The Millers Point Resident Action Group, which had been established in 1969, protested the proposed sale of some of the Millers Point shops.

Despite the Heritage Act being passed in 1977, it was not until 1988 that Millers Point was afforded protection under the Act. In 1988 the Millers Point Conservation Area was inscribed on the State Heritage Register as being of State significance and covered those properties in the ownership of Department of Housing including the subject site. In the following year Millers Point was recognised on the City of Sydney's local heritage register. In 2003 the area was listed in its entirety as the Millers Point & Dawes Point Village Precinct.

A review of leasing arrangements was undertaken in 2006. It noted "a peppercorn rent is applicable at 85 Lower Fort Street and that rental obtained from lodgers is retained by the management committed to cover the cost expenses (gas/electricity), the cost of common area cleaning by an external cleaner, provision of toiletries and day to day maintenance." Also he understood that there was only one lodger currently in occupation at "Argyle House".

== Description ==
The site is situated to the northwest of Lower Fort Street, between Argyle Place and Windmill Street, Millers Point. It is formed by a series of retaining walls and terracing downward to the northwest. The immediate area is generally characterised by one- and two-storey mixed development including housing, the Hero of Waterloo Hotel, community and commercial buildings and the Garrison (Holy Trinity) Church.

=== External building description ===
The former nineteenth century character of Millers Point and Dawes Point was altered by the construction of the Sydney Harbour Bridge and the loss of housing in the area, particularly the loss of Upper Fort Street. Argyle House is located on the boundary with Lower Fort Street, and appears as a two-storey building. The rear of the building includes a basement level, which is currently accessible only from the rear yard. The yard is paved with concrete and the lower area is finished with brick pavers (c. 1990s), with raised garden areas created adjacent the house and by retaining walls. The yard contains a privy (c. 1900) and a clothes line.

Generally

85 Lower Fort Street, Millers Point, was constructed as a free-standing masonry townhouse situated on the northwest side Lower Fort Street. The building comprises two storeys and a basement; the main fa;:ade being aligned with its Lower Fort Street boundary. The two-storey façade of the building is symmetrical, centred on the front entrance door and a window at the upper level.

Roof

The roof is a timber-framed structure with a corrugated steel roof with a "quad" profile gutter located on the western side of the roof and a box gutter located behind the parapet aligned with Lower Fort Street (eastern) elevation. Chimneys are located adjacent to the north and south parapet walls. The roof finish, gutters and downpipes were replaced in the 1990s.

Walls

The external walls are masonry, rendered in imitation ashlar. The sandstone base has been painted and metal ventilation grilles are now partially concealed by pavement finishes in Lower Fort Street. At the time of inspection in October 2016, the rear wall was painted in a cream colour, while the remainder of the building was painted in off white and brown to complement the sandstone of the Hero of Waterloo Hotel (refer to Figure 26).

External joinery

Windows and external doors have been repaired and or replaced during the twentieth century. Windows on the main fa9ade differ slightly from those on the remainder of the building, in that the head of each upper sash is curved. The remaining windows have flat heads to upper timber sashes. External joinery is painted. Internal joinery, now painted throughout the building, originally included some clear finishes.

=== Internal building description ===
The building was adapted as two separate apartments by the NSW Department of Housing in c. 1990. Works included the installation of new ceilings in some spaces to provide fire separation.

Ceilings

The original ceilings throughout the building were traditional lath and plaster. Documentary evidence indicates damaged ceilings were replaced with lath and plaster following a fire in the late 1990s.

Cornices

Ground floor spaces include decorative run plaster cornices, while the first floor spaces are square set. There is no surviving evidence of cornice details at the basement level.

Walls

Internal walls are constructed using traditional load-bearing masonry walls with a lime plaster finish. Original plaster finishes appear to have been retained and repaired generally at ground and first floor levels. Plaster finishes at the basement. Documentary evidence indicates the lime plaster wall finishes in the basement were replaced following a fire, however those replacement finishes have subsequently deteriorated and would require further replacement.

Skirting

The building contains painted timber skirtings throughout the Ground and First floor levels.

Floors

The timber floorboards throughout the main spaces appear to be original nineteenth century fabric, although they have been re-finished in a clear polyurethane product. Surviving floorboards at first floor level have been painted since 2000.

Windows

The surviving windows are double-hung timber framed windows, with sash cords and weights. The top sashes of all windows facing Lower Fort Street have curved timber heads, while all other windows are flat.

Doors

The main entrance door is the original front door with four raised and fielded panels and bolection moulds. The original letter slot is located centrally in the lock rail. Surviving original internal doors are four panel doors with sunk moulds. New hardware has been installed to all doors, however some original rimlocks have been retained in situ. All joinery has a painted finish.

Other

The original timber stair has been retained, including newel post, balusters and handrail. The original clear finish has been painted. Chimney pieces throughout the building have been removed, although the existing hearths appears to be original nineteenth century fabric.

=== Condition ===
As at 29 May 2017, the exterior of the building has been generally well maintained in recent years and the roof, walls and balcony are in good condition.

=== Modifications and dates ===
External: Skillion side addition, iron fence added. Facade needs repairs.

=== Further information ===
The overall form of 85 Lower Fort Street, and its interior configuration, is intact, despite changes to fabric, particularly since ca2000, when internal finishes were substantially replaced. Original joinery, including the upper level of the stair, is evident through the building, and could be replicated based on site evidence if necessary. The external walls and fenestration have been retained. The roof was replaced c. 2000, together with rainwater heads, gutters and downpipes resulting in the removal of original details. Current gutters are a "quad" profile. The original internal layout is visible although the original stair connecting the basement and ground level has been removed. The Basement level is in a deteriorated state, and is currently uninhabitable. The rear yard and setting of the building has been altered, and new paved surfaces introduced. The brick privy structure has been retained as an element within the rear yard.

== Heritage listing ==
As at 23 November 2000, 85 Lower Fort Street contributes to the State heritage significance of the Millers Point Conservation Area and has cultural significance at a State level because:

It demonstrates, as part of a wider context of Millers Point, the historical development of Millers Point in the second half of the nineteenth century to provide residential and ancillary accommodation associated with the wharves and maritime industry; and it has, as part of a wider context of Millers Point, considerable aesthetic value contributing to the cohesiveness of the Lower Fort Street streetscape and is a part of a rare urban residential precinct. The building is an important streetscape element as part of the row of buildings dating from the second half of the nineteenth century that form the Lower Fort Street, Windmill Street and ArgylePlace. The place demonstrates significance at the State level through its associations with a community in NSW for social, and cultural reasons. 85 Lower Fort Street served the Millers Point and Dawes Point community as a Baby Health Clinic from 1924 to 1952, at which time it was transferred to an adjacent site.

85 Lower Fort Street is evidence of the change in residential and commercial development of Millers Point from the 1870s onwards, when it became progressively characterised as a working-class area as wealthier residents increasingly abandoned the inner city for the suburbs. The terrace demonstrates the development of the Sydney Harbour Trust as it progressively resumed land in the area and took responsibility for the wharves and accommodating workers associated with the maritime industry. It is part of the state significant Millers Point Conservation Area, which is a rare and intact residential and maritime precinct containing residential buildings and civic spaces dating from the 1830s and is evidence of the gradual change of maritime activities from private to public ownership during the nineteenth century; and 85 Lower Fort Street and its site have the potential to provide information on nineteenth century construction techniques and minor potential for archaeological deposits in sub floor spaces.

Argyle House was listed on the New South Wales State Heritage Register on 2 April 1999 having satisfied the following criteria.

The place is important in demonstrating the course, or pattern, of cultural or natural history in New South Wales.

85 Lower Fort Street demonstrates the historical development of Millers Point in the second half of the nineteenth century to provide residential and ancillary accommodation associated with the wharve s and maritime industry.

It is evidence of the change in residential and commercial development of Millers Point from the 1870s onwards, when it became progressively characterised as a working-class area as wealthier residents increasingly abandoned the inner city for the suburbs. The building demonstrates the development of the Sydney Harbour Trust as it progressively resumed land in the area in 1900, transferring it from private to public ownership, and took responsibility for the wharves and providing social services and accommodation for workers associated with the maritime industry.

85 Lower Fort Street has historic significance as a baby health clinic serving Millers Point and Dawes Point between 1924 and 1952. 85 Lower Fort Street Millers Point is of historical significance for its contribution to the history of the Millers Point and Dawes Point Precinct, a precinct of historical significance at a State level. As a specific individual component of this wider precinct, 85 Lower Fort Street has historical significance under this criterion at a local and state level.

The place has a strong or special association with a person, or group of persons, of importance of cultural or natural history of New South Wales's history.

85 Lower Fort Street contributes to the associative significance to the history of the Millers Point and Dawes Point Precinct. As a specific individual component of this wider precinct, 85 Lower Fort Street has significance under this criterion at a local/state level. 85 Lower Fort Street was constructed as a private development by George Minton in c. 1882 and has a significant historical association with the Sydney Harbour Trust following its acquisition in 1900 and later with the Maritime Services Board (from 1936) and the NSW Housing Commission in 1983. The place contributes to satisfying this criterion at a State level.

The place is important in demonstrating aesthetic characteristics and/or a high degree of creative or technical achievement in New South Wales.

85 Lower Fort Street Millers Point is of aesthetic significance for its contribution to the character and architecture of the Millers Point and Dawes Point Precinct, a precinct of aesthetic significance at a State level. As a specific individual component of this wider precinct, 85 Lower Fort Street has aesthetic significance under this criterion at a local and state level. 85 Lower Fort Street demonstrates aesthetic values as part of Millers Point generally. The scale of the building is consistent with, and contributes to, the surviving Victorian and later residential character of the immediate area of Lower Fort Street and the Millers Point area generally. The building is an important streetscape element in views north from Observatory Hill to nineteenth century buildings in Argyle Place and Lower Fort Street. The place contributes to satisfying this criterion at a State level.

The place has a strong or special association with a particular community or cultural group in New South Wales for social, cultural or spiritual reasons.

The Millers Point and Dawes Point Precinct has social significance at a State level. Current and former residents, many with generations of family connection to Millers Point, have a loyal sense of community and a strong connection with the place. It is also valued by the NSW community for its long and varied history of European settlement and occupancy. These values have been recognised in the State Heritage Register listing of the precinct. As an individual component of this wider precinct, 85 Lower Fort Street has social significance at both local and state level. The place demonstrates significance at the State level through its associations with a community in NSW for social and cultural reasons. 85 Lower Fort Street served the Millers Point and Dawes Point community as a Baby Health Clinic from 1924 to 1952, at which time it was transferred to an adjacent site.

The place has potential to yield information that will contribute to an understanding of the cultural or natural history of New South Wales.

The surviving c. 1882 building fabric comprising 85 Lower Fort Street has the potential to yield information on construction methods of the time. There is minor potential for under floor and rear yard archaeological deposits given previous development of the site. The original design and surviving internal configuration of the building may yield further information about the design and function of late nineteenth century residential accommodation in the Millers Point area. The place satisfies this criterion at a local level.

The place possesses uncommon, rare or endangered aspects of the cultural or natural history of New South Wales.

85 Lower Fort Street is a rare surviving example of a privately built and owned speculative development in Millers Point in the late nineteenth century nineteenth century and a contributory element within Millers Point as part of a rare urban residential precinct. The place contributes to satisfying this criterion at a State level.

The place is important in demonstrating the principal characteristics of a class of cultural or natural places/environments in New South Wales.

85 Lower Fort Street is of representative significance for its ability to demonstrate one or more of the principal characteristics of the Millers Point and Dawes Point, a precinct of representative significance at State level as a nineteenth and twentieth century maritime precinct which provided work and housing for its population which later evolved into social housing for descendent families of workers 85 Lower Fort Street has representative significance under this criterion at a local and state level.

== See also ==
- Australian residential architectural styles
