= Orgill =

Orgill is a Pict surname originating from the ancient townland of Cargill in modern day Scotland.

Variants include Cargill, Cargyle, (Mc)Argyle, Argle and Argles, Argill, Corgill, MacOrkill, McGirl, Mac Fheargail, Mac Fhearghail & Mag Fheargail.

Notable people with the surname include:

- Dever Orgill (born 1990), Jamaican footballer
- Nikola Orgill (born 1993), Australian soccer player
- William Orgill (fl. 1847), founder of Orgill (company), American hardware distributor
