= Shipwrights Arms Inn =

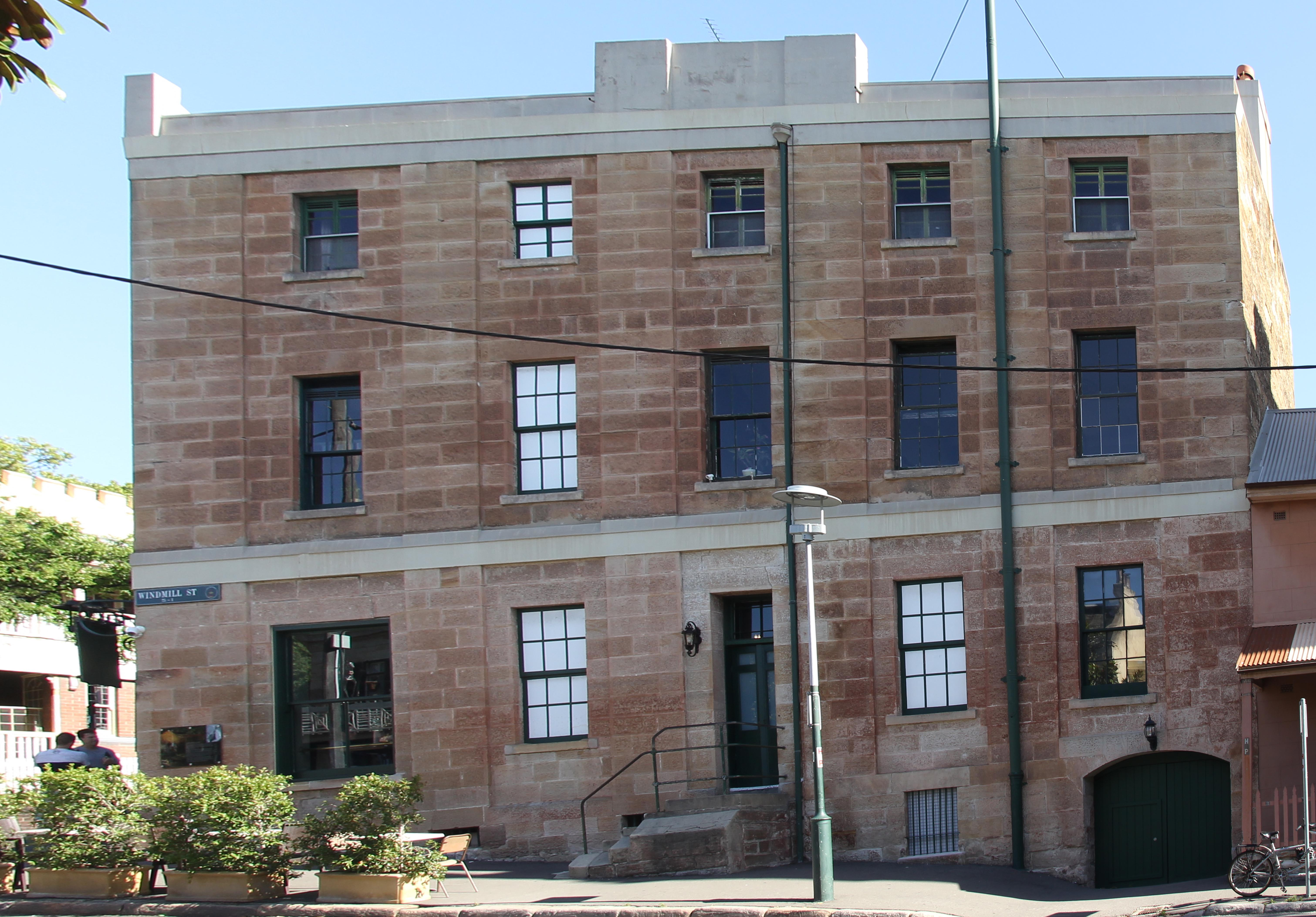
- Shipwrights Arms Inn, viewed from Windmill Street in 2019.

- Location within Sydney Location within Australia
- 33.8577°S 151.2057°E
- Location: 75 Windmill Street, Millers Point, City of Sydney, New South Wales, Australia

History
- Built: 1832–1834

New South Wales Heritage Register
- Official name: Shipwrights Arms Inn (former); Shop
- Type: State heritage (built)
- Designated: 2 April 1999
- Reference no.: 850
- Type: Inn/Tavern
- Category: Commercial

The Shipwrights Arms Inn is a heritage-listed residence and former inn and boarding house located at 75 Windmill Street, in the inner city Sydney suburb of Millers Point in the City of Sydney local government area of New South Wales, Australia. It was built from 1832 to 1834. It was added to the New South Wales State Heritage Register on 2 April 1999.

== History ==
On 20 November 1830, David Leighton (son of John "Jack the Miller" Leighton) sold a parcel land to newly-arrived emigrant, John Clarke. The land was described as bounded by Windmill Street to the northwest, Lower Fort Street to the southeast, on the southwest by Henry McGee's land, and on the northeast by government land. Plans of Sydney from 1825 and 1828 do not show any buildings on the site, so it is concluded that the land was vacant at the time of the sale in 1830.

A few months later, after Clarke had begun to fence the land in accordance with government requirements, the Director of Public Works instructed him to remove the fencing because the ground was dedicated government land. Clarke's appeal to be permitted to retain the land was eventually granted on the basis of his purchase in good faith; Leighton claimed that he had been entitled to sell the land which was purchased from Patrick Marmount, who was given it by Governor Macquarie as compensation for land resumed for the government windmill.

In settling the claim to the land, Clarke was instructed to divide the land with James Lucas, who had purchased an adjacent allotment with a questionable chain of title.

On 17 June 1833, Clarke obtained a Publican's Licence for a new hotel known as the Shipwright's Arms in Windmill Street and he renewed his licence annually until July 1836 which enabled him to trade as publican until July 1837. As Clarke did not own any other land on Windmill Street, nor did he hold any other hotel licences at this time, it is concluded that the licence was issued for a hotel occupying the building at 75 Windmill Street. The words 'Shipwright's Arms' were revealed to still be located on the facade of the building in the late 20th century.

The 'Shipwright's Arms' not only served alcohol but, in line with the regulations of the day, also provided board and lodging. In 1835, Clarke placed a notice in the Sydney Herald stating:

"If Edward Humble, a seafaring man, (late of the Harriet), do not come forward and pay the Debt he owes me for Board, Lodging, &c.;, within twenty-one days from this date, the Property left in my possession will be sold and the proceeds appropriated towards the liquidation of the same."

— John Clark, Windmill Street, Sydney, January 17, 1835.

With Windmill Street being the main thoroughfare through to Millers Point proper and with direct links through to the (what is now known as) Walsh Bay wharves area and the steam ferry to the north via Pottinger Street, the intersection of Windmill Street and Lower Fort Street must have been a commercially vibrant area frequented by a range of maritime workers and merchants.

Several other public houses ('pubs') were located in Windmill Street during this period, but the Shipwright's Arms was one of the earliest. The Whalers' Arms had stood on the opposite side of Windmill Street since 1831, but in 1839 it moved to a new building on the corner of Lower Fort Street and Windmill Street. The Hit or Miss and the Live and Let Live Hotels were built after Clarke's Shipwright's Arms on adjacent allotments to the south. The Hero of Waterloo Hotel was built on the adjacent site to the east by George Paton, stonemason, between 1840 and 1845 on land which he purchased from John Clarke's son following the elder's death in 1838. The Hero of Waterloo and two Whalers' Arms hotels, as well as the front verandah of No. 75 Windmill Street are visible in John Rae's c. 1845 painting "View down Windmill Street".

John Clarke died on 20 July 1838, leaving five sons, the eldest also named John Clarke. John Clarke the younger subsequently applied for a deed of grant for the site (to be managed in trust on behalf of all five brothers) on 6 December 1839 and following an assessment by the Court of Claims, the land was granted on 18 June 1840 to John Clarke, cabinet maker. It was at this time that Clarke sold the corner portion of the land to George Paton, stonemason, who constructed the Hero of Waterloo Hotel on the site.

Another of Clarke's sons, William Clarke, a cabinet-maker of Hunters Hill, received the title to the southern half of the allotment (fronting Lower Fort Street and today containing Argyle House, No. 85 Lower Fort Street) in 1844 and he constructed a single storey, three room, brick with shingled roof cottage with front verandah and an outbuilding.

At some stage this separate dwelling and outbuilding, together with a yard area was fenced off from No. 75 Windmill Street and a right-ofway was formed giving access from the rear of the building at 75 Windmill Street to Lower Fort Street. This right-of-way still exists between the Hero of Waterloo Hotel and Argyle House.

The rates assessment books from 1845 to 1948, variously describe the building at 75 Windmill Street as being either "stone" or "brick", with "brick" appearing more often in the records. A detached kitchen is also occasionally included in the description of the place.

In c. 1845 the hipped roof form was altered for the construction of the Hero of Waterloo adjacent.

In 1847, the title to the land was conveyed to three of John Clarke's five sons: James Richard Clarke (cabinet-maker, Sydney), Charles George Clarke (Sydney, shoemaker), and Edward Thomas Clarke (Sydney, mastmaker) as trustees. The City of Sydney Council rate books indicate that the property was occupied in that year by Robert Guy Torr, and the structure was described as a two-storey stone building with shingled roof containing eight rooms with a back kitchen.

In 1853 the Clarke family trustees conveyed the property to Charles Stewart Quail, who in turn, nine months later, sold it to John Hordern of the well-known mercantile dynasty. After John Hordern's death in 1864, the property remained in the ownership of his trustees' until the 1880s.

Hordern never occupied the building leasing the building throughout his period of ownership, and it continued to be leased following his death. Rosa Strange had operated a school on the premises in the early 1860s and Thomas Milton, a shipwright, lived at 75 Windmill Street from c. 1871 until 1882.

After this tenancy, the property became a boarding house under the management of Charles Lamb.

In 1880, Hordern's trustees advertised the property for sale. Perhaps in relation to the intended sale, F. H. Reuss surveyed the property in 1881 and produced a plan of it. Julia Quinn, a widow, purchased the site in 1886. She paid less for the land in 1886 than John Hordern had in 1853, and Quinn's transaction also included land in Newtown. This may reflect the perceived "obsolescence" of the building. During Julia Quinn's ownership, the property continued to be used as a boarding house for a number of years. It also appears that new rear outbuildings were constructed directly linking to the rear (south) elevation of the Main wing.

=== Resumption of No. 75 Windmill Street ===
In 1902, the property (at this time known as No. 65 Windmill Street) was assessed for rates by the City Council and the landlord was still listed as Mary Quinn, while the occupant was listed as John Ryan. The building was described as a dwelling house of stone with an iron roof of two floors with a total of eight rooms.

By the time of the next rates assessment in 1907, the owner of the building (still known as No. 65 Windmill Street) was listed as the "NSW Government Rocks Resumption" with Ellen Josephson as the occupier.

Following the resumption of the property, the Sydney Harbour Trust, and subsequently the Maritime Services Board leased 75 Windmill Street to private tenants as a single dwelling house. New outbuildings appear to have been constructed by the Sydney Harbour Trust about 1915, around the same time that the demolished houses on the south side of the street were being replaced by model workers' housing.

In 1966, an application was lodged with the City Council by a Mrs L. Garroway on behalf of the Maritime Services Board, for use of the two front rooms as doctor's consulting and waiting rooms. A Dr. Geoffrey Davis occupied the front of the building until well into the 1980s.

A number of photographs of Windmill Street taken during the first half of the 20th century show No. 75 Windmill Street visible to the right of the Hero of Waterloo and the building remains largely unchanged over the decades represented by these images.

=== Public Housing period (1986 to date) ===
The ownership of the property was transferred from the Maritime Services Board to the (former) Department of Housing in 1986. By 1991 the property was vacant and in 1992, a conservation plan for the building was prepared by Howard Tanner & Associates Architects. This was followed in 1995 by comprehensive restoration and upgrading works including the construction of a new rear wing addition containing a family room, laundry and WC fitout. The rear (south) bedroom on the eastern side at first floor level was converted into a bathroom and store and the rear (south) room on the eastern side at ground floor level was converted into a kitchen.

At this time, the Sydney Harbour Trust outbuildings were demolished. Following these works, the property was used as a residence, managed by the Department of Families and Community Services.

== Description ==
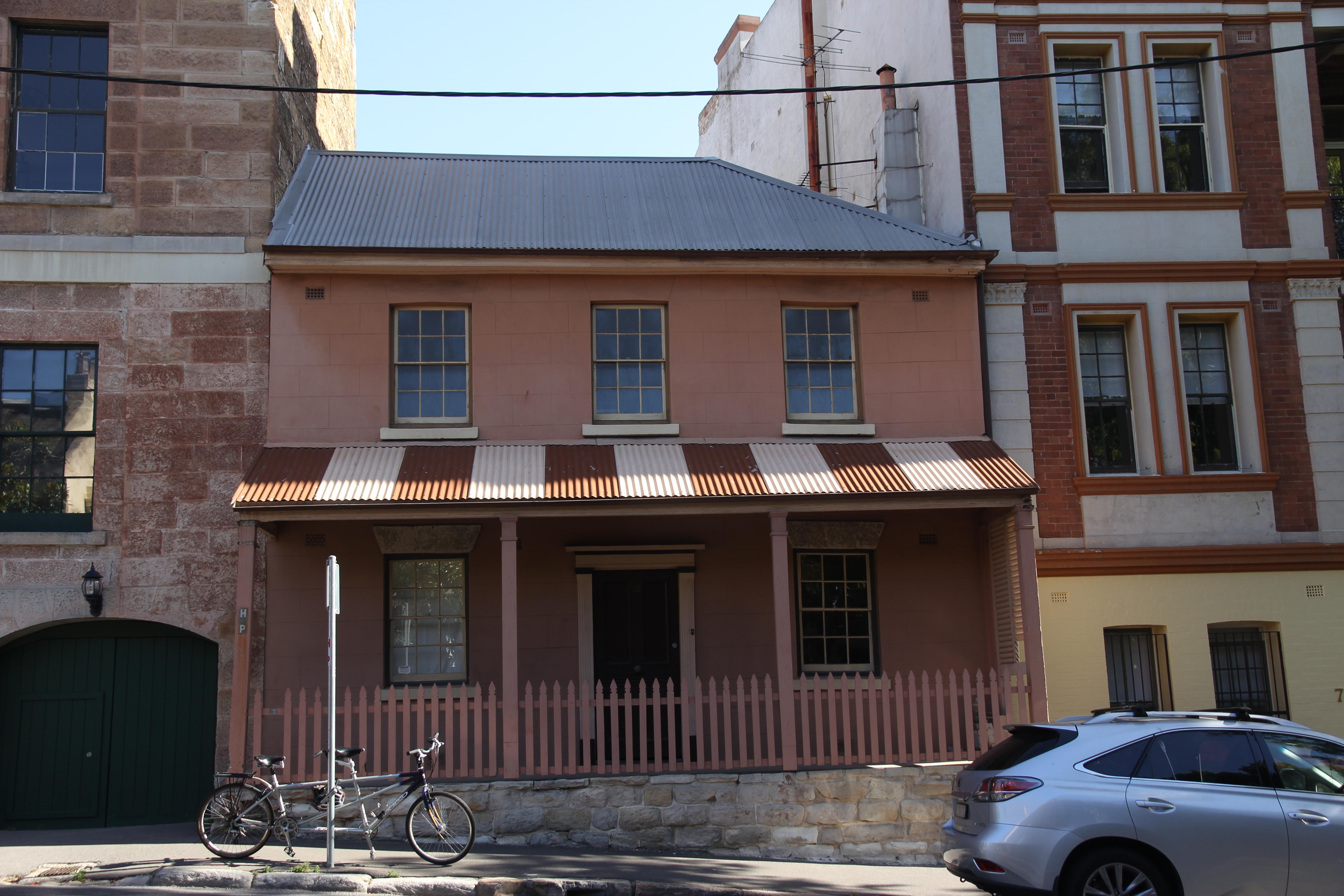
The adjoining two-storey rear wing, pictured in 2019, facing Windmill Street.

Constructed in c. 1832-33 as a public house or "town inn", No. 75 Windmill Street is a two-storey building with a hipped roof and front verandah and with a later addition single storey rear wing.

=== Main wing ===
The Main wing is a corrugated metal, hipped roof building with painted cement rendered front and rear elevations marked out in ashlar over face brick with stone window sills and stone lintels and voussoirs to the ground floor front (north) windows.

The eastern and western elevations of the Main wing abut the adjoining properties at No. 73 Windmill Street (to the west) and No. 81-83 Lower Fort Street (Hero of Waterloo Hotel to the east). The building is fronted with a corrugated metal roofed verandah with timber posts, louvred end screen and balustrade set on a sandstone base wall. The verandah is accessed from its eastern end. The front door of the building is a timber four panelled door with reeding and is surrounded by painted timber external pilasters and entablature.

The main wing has two chimneys, one on the north side of the roof ridge being cement rendered, possibly brickwork with a sheet metal extension and the other on the southern side of the roof ridge being face brick work bagged over with cement with very large metal extension. Generally, roofing accessories, gutters and downpipes are modern and are either galvanised steel or zincalume.

=== Rear wing ===
The rear wing was constructed in the mid to late 1990s and is a single storey, painted timber clad building with curved metal roof, timber framed doors and windows and projecting eaves with turned timber brackets.

=== Interiors of No. 75 Windmill Street ===
==== Main Wing ====
The ground floor of the Main wing consists of three living rooms and a later kitchen fitout to the rear room on the eastern side. Entry from the original front door leads directly into the main front room with no entry hall or vestibule. The eastern front room at ground floor retains its original timber cornice and ceiling rose. These features (the front door case, cornice and ceiling rose) all dating from 1832–33, are considered to be rare.

The fireplace in the main (west) front room at ground level has been brick over and has a painted timber chimney piece. The first floor consists of a large front room and smaller bedroom to the rear (south) on the western side. The former bedroom to the rear (south) on the eastern side has been partitioned and converted into a bathroom and store room in the late 20th century. Throughout the main wing, the ceilings are a mix of lath and plaster or plasterboard (aside from the main front roof at first floor level which has a timber boarded ceiling), some with timber battening, lime plaster walls, timber skirtings, architraves and linings to doors and windows.

The timber stairs are mostly original with some repairs and reconstruction work. The staircase is timber lined. Both the ground and first floor levels are carpeted (excluding the bathroom, store room and kitchen) over timber flooring.

==== Rear Wing ====
The interiors of the Rear wing are plasterboard ceilings and walls with timber skirtings and carpet or tiles over a concrete slab. The rear wing consists of a family room, laundry and WC.

=== Landscape and Vegetation ===
The subject building occupies the whole of the northern (front) portion of the allotment with the front verandah of the main wing projecting into the public footpath. To the rear (south) is a small rear yard. The rear wing of the main building is located on the western portion of the site. The eastern enclosure of the place is defined by the rear elevations of the Hero of Waterloo Hotel and the southern enclosure of the place is defined by the rear elevation of No. 85 Lower Fort Street. Access from No. 85 Lower Fort Street into the rear yard of No. 75 Windmill is provided via a paved pathway. The rear yard is a mix of paving, with raised brick garden beds and cement rendered steps leading to the shared right-of-way located in the south-eastern corner of the property. There are no substantial plantings located at the place.

=== Setting ===
The place is located on the southern side of Windmill Street, close to the junction with Lower Fort Street. Windmill Street is the main access road connecting Lower Fort Street in the east to Millers Point proper in the west and is one of the oldest streets in the Millers Point precinct. Although located above the level of the Walsh Bay wharf area, views of this former commercial maritime precinct from Windmill Street are no longer available due to substantial development undertaken throughout the 20th century to the north of the street. The buildings on the southern side of Windmill Street consist of a mix of former commercial buildings dating from the colonial period (1830s and 1840s), row housing dating from the latter half of the 19th century and purpose-built worker's housing built in the early 20th century.

=== Condition ===
The Main Wing of No. 75 Windmill Street remains highly intact to its original configuration retaining most of its internal layout and detailing. However, the place has undergone some change during the early and late 20th century, the most significant being the loss of the original partitioning that formed the front rooms at first floor level.

Externally, the Main Wing is also highly intact, although restoration and repair works in the 1990s have resulted in the rendering of the front facade (possibly the reconstruction of an early addition).

The Rear Wing to the property is a later addition (c. 1995), although its location on the west side of the property and general form and scale are not incompatible with evidence of the original/early outbuildings.

The whole of the site is also highly intact to its late 19th century configuration and includes an early site feature, the passageway linking the property to Lower Fort Street in the south that was formed in the 1840s.

== Heritage listing ==
No. 75 Windmill Street is historically significant on a State level for being a very rare and relatively intact surviving example of a purpose built domestic form "town inn". Constructed in c.1832-33, it is the earliest surviving hotel building located in Millers Point, one of Australia's oldest urban precincts and also one of a small and rare group of colonial public house buildings located in the immediate locality.

The building is aesthetically significant on a State level as a very good example of a relatively intact example of a Colonial Georgian style town building containing some features of outstanding significance due to their style and rarity, including the front door case, the front verandah (albeit with altered balustrade), the ceiling cornice and ceiling rose in Space 2 as well as the sandstock brickwork and painted signage known to exist on the front facade (albeit covered by lateraddition render).

It is also aesthetically significant on a State level for its contribution to the character of Windmill Street, one of the oldest streets in Millers Point and as one of a small group of surviving colonial buildings located around the junction of Windmill and Lower Fort Streets, forming part of a rare, remnant colonial streetscape. The place is part of a group of buildings of remarkable integrity and consistency of 19th century and early 20th century form and detail within Millers Point. The place makes an important contribution to the character Millers Point, a precinct of aesthetic significance on a State level and this contribution makes No. 75 Windmill Street also of aesthetic significance on a State level.

The building and its history is likely to be held in high esteem by those interested in Sydney's early history, the history of public houses in Australia and Australia's early architecture. It is also likely to be valued by groups of people who live or have lived in Millers Point in recent decades, a precinct of State significance for its social and cultural values.

The place has moderate potential to contain archaeological deposits within subfloor areas and building cavities and low potential for underground archaeological deposits, which have the potential to further contribute to an understanding of early 19th century public houses and domestic life in Australia.

Shipwrights Arms Inn was listed on the New South Wales State Heritage Register on 2 April 1999 having satisfied the following criteria.

The place is important in demonstrating the course, or pattern, of cultural or natural history in New South Wales.

Constructed in c.1832–33 for use as a public house (operating until c.1837) the former 'Shipwright's Arms', No. 75 Windmill Street is of exceptional historical significant as being the oldest of a small group of surviving colonial public houses in Millers Point, and is evidence of the earliest form of such buildings. No. 75 Windmill Street is a rare, surviving example of a "town inn" (a public house providing liquor, food and accommodation within a domestic form building located within an urban setting), constructed in this form to meet colonial legislative requirements of the 1830s restricting the sale of liquor.

The configuration of the site, including the rear wing, the alignment of the adjoining properties to the east, west and south and the shared passageway leading to Lower Fort Street are historically significant as evidence of the early (1840s) subdivision of Millers Point, one of Australia's earliest suburbs.

As one of a small, surviving group of colonial commercial buildings located near the junction of Windmill and Lower Fort Streets, the property is significant as being part of the early commercial development of Walsh Bay and Millers Point, two of Australia's earliest urban precincts.

The place meets the criteria for historical significance on a State and Local level.

The place has a strong or special association with a person, or group of persons, of importance of cultural or natural history of New South Wales's history.

No. 75 Windmill Street contributes to the associative significance of the history of the Millers Point and Dawes Point Precinct. As a specific individual component of this wider precinct, the subject property has significance under this criterion at a local level as one of the properties resumed by the NSW Government in c.1902 throughout the locality and subsequently managed by the Sydney Harbour Trust as a single residence (although very little physical evidence of their involvement survives).

The place meets the criteria for historical associational significance ona Local level.

The place is important in demonstrating aesthetic characteristics and/or a high degree of creative or technical achievement in New South Wales.

The form of the subject property is of aesthetic significance as a very good example of a relatively intact Colonial Georgian style town building, demonstrating the aesthetic characteristics of a colonial domestic form building, including the symmetrical facade, (original) exposed brick walling, stone lintels and sills, verandah with separate roof, lourvred shutters and classical detailing to front door case. The place is indicative of the pre-1900s architectural character of Millers Point and because of its age and rarity, the building has some value as a comparative example of 1830s building construction techniques.

Constructed in 1832–33, the building contains some features of outstanding significance for their style and rarity, including the front door case, Space 2 ceiling cornice and ceiling rose and the front verandah (albeit with altered balustrade). Originally constructed in sandstock brick with the name "Shipwright's Arm's" painted on its front facade and which is known to survive under the later addition render is of outstanding significance.

The place is part of a very rare group of colonial buildings (along with the Hero of Waterloo Hotel, No. 67 Windmill Street, Nos. 80 to 92 Windmill Street opposite and the new Whaler's Arms Hotel, No. 79 Lower Fort Street) which together are indicative of colonial streetscapes in Australia (as illustrated by John Rae in 1842). Together with the majority of the properties located on the eastern end of Windmill Street at the junction with Lower Fort Street, the place forms part of unique group of early buildings showing remarkable integrity and consistency of 19th and early 20th century character.

Located in Millers Point, one of Australia's oldest urban precincts and on Windmill Street, one of the oldest streets in the precinct, the place makes a significant contribution to the character and architecture of Millers Point, a precinct of historic, social and aesthetic significance on a State level and this contribution makes No. 75 Windmill Street also of aesthetic significance on a State level.

The place meets the criteria for aesthetic significance on a State and local level.

The place has a strong or special association with a particular community or cultural group in New South Wales for social, cultural or spiritual reasons.

The building is likely to be held in esteem by groups interested in theearly history of Sydney, and groups of people who have lived in Millers Point or The Rocks in recent decades including descendants of the early residents of the place and the locality and former public housing residents of the place and the locality and their descendants since the resumption of the area by the NSW State government in c.1900.

The place is significant for being located within and associated with the historic, social and aestheticsignificance of the Millers Point and Dawes Point Precinct and Millers Point Conservation Area, areas of State significance in their own right for their social and cultural values. This significance is reflected in the many heritage listings that exist both for the property, its setting and the State significant precincts of Millers Point and Dawes Point.

The place meets the criteria for social significance on a State and Local level.

The place has potential to yield information that will contribute to an understanding of the cultural or natural history of New South Wales.

Given that the place is relatively intact to its c.1832-33 configuration; there is high potential for archaeological deposits remaining within the building cavities, roof spaces and below the ground floor level, although this potential may have been reduced as a result of 1990s refurbishment works.

Any deposits found dating from the early 19th century could be of high significance and have the potential to contribute to an understanding of early inns in Sydney, very few of which still survive and early domestic life in Australia generally. Archaeological remains related to the original use of the place would be of exceptional significance.

The analysis of the archaeological resource of the whole of the Rocksand Millers Point notes that No. 75 Windmill Street has been partly disturbed and recommends an archaeological assessment of the place.

The place meets the criteria for scientific significance on a State and Local level.

The place possesses uncommon, rare or endangered aspects of the cultural or natural history of New South Wales.

The former 'Shipwright's Arms' Inn, No. 75 Windmill Street is a very rare, colonial, domestic form "town inn" located within an urban centre. Although inn buildings of a domestic form are found throughout regional NSW, only No. 75 Windmill Street and Lilyvale, 176 Cumberland Street are known to be surviving examples of this particular form of public house in the City of Sydney.

Their location in the heart of Sydney, Australia's first settlement and only urban centre existing in the 1830s makes these buildings of exceptional significance.

No. 75 Windmill Street is the oldest surviving public house building located within Millers Point and its domestic form again makes this building of exceptional significance, given that all other surviving colonial public houses in Millers Point would be classified as "taverns" and are commercial style buildings.

The place contains a number of features dating from 1832-33 including the front door case, the cornice and ceiling rose to Space 2 and the front verandah (albeit with later balustrade) which are rare, surviving, colonial architectural features.

The place meets the criteria for rarity on a State and Local level.

The place is important in demonstrating the principal characteristics of a class of cultural or natural places/environments in New South Wales.

The place is representative on a Local and State level of a colonial public house of which there are a number of forms. The former 'Shipwright's Arms' Inn is a very rare, colonial, domestic form "town inn" located within an urban centre. Although inn buildings of a domestic form are found throughout regional NSW, other known historic examples of the "town inn", including the Pulteney Hotel, Petty's Hotel, the Three Tuns and the Rose and Crown, no longer survive. Only No. 75 Windmill Street and Lilyvale, 176 Cumberland Street are known to be surviving examples of this particular form of public house in the City of Sydney and their location in the heart of Sydney, Australia's first settlement and urban centre makes these buildings of exceptional significance.

As the place was originally constructed as a public house, the Shipwright's Arms, the place is one of a small and unique group of surviving colonial hotel, tavern or inn buildings located within the Millers Point area which together demonstrate the development of colonial public houses in Sydney. However, of this group, No. 75 Windmill Street is the only example of the domestic form colonial "town inn", as all other surviving colonial public houses in Millers Point would be classified as "taverns" and are commercial style buildings.

As a surviving colonial building located on Windmill Street, the place forms part of a group of residential and commercial buildings that are representative of the early (pre-1850) configuration and development of one of the oldest streets in the locality, which was developed in association with the initial stone quarrying of Millers Point, the windmills located on Jack the Miller's Point and the commercial wharfs at Walsh Bay, and which is one of Australia' oldest suburbs.

The history of the place, from the initial the construction of the building and its varied use as a public house, single residence, boarding house and school, its resumption by the government and subsequent use of the place as public housing in its various forms, is somewhat typical also of the history of residential development throughout Millers Point.

The place meets the criteria for representativeness on a State and Local level

== See also ==
- Stevens Terrace
