= Argile (disambiguation) =

Argile was a French poetry and art magazine published between 1973 and 1981.

Argile may also refer to:

- Argile Smith (born 1955), clergyman and interim university president
- Castello d'Argile, a commune in Bologna, Italy

== See also ==
- Argyle (disambiguation)
- Argyll (disambiguation)
- Argle (disambiguation)
