= Argyle Street =

Argyle Street may refer to:

- Argyle Street, Bath, England, United Kingdom
- Argyle Street, Chicago, Illinois, United States
- Argyll Street, Dunoon, Scotland
- Argyle Street, Glasgow, Scotland, United Kingdom
- Argyle Street, Halifax, Canada
- Argyle Street, Hobart, Tasmania, Australia
- Argyle Street, Hong Kong
- Argyll Street, London, England, United Kingdom
- Argyle Street, Norwich, England, United Kingdom

== See also ==
- Argyle station, Chicago, Illinois, United States
- Argyle Street Camp, a Japanese World War II prisoner-of-war camp in Kowloon, Hong Kong
- Argyle Street railway station, Glasgow, Scotland, United Kingdom
- Argyle (disambiguation)
- Argyll (disambiguation)
