= Argyle station =

Argyle station may refer to:

- Argyle station (CTA), Chicago, United States
- Argyle railway station (New South Wales), Australia
- Argyle Station, Argyle, Manitoba, Canada, a village around the now closed railway station
- Argyle Station, Nova Scotia, Canada, in the Municipality of the District of Argyle
- Mong Kok station, Hong Kong, formerly known as Argyle

== See also ==
- Argyle (disambiguation)
- Argyle Downs, a cattle station in the Kimberley region, Australia
- Argyle Street railway station, Glasgow, Scotland
