= Argyle (surname) =

Argyle is a surname. Notable people with the surname include:

- Fiona Argyle, Australian politician
- Jessie Argyle (1900–1955), Australian Aboriginal woman
- John Argyle (1911–1962), British screenwriter, producer and film director
- Michael Argyle (judge) (1915–1999), British judge
- Michael Argyle (psychologist) (1925–2002), British social psychologist
- Pearl Argyle (1910–1947), South African ballet dancer and actress
- Stanley Argyle (1867–1940), Australian politician
- Steve Argyle, American artist

== See also ==
- Argyle (disambiguation)
