= Argyle (1807 ship) =

U slave and merchant ship 1807–1823

History

United Kingdom Great Britain
- Name: Argyle
- Launched: 1807, Liverpool
- Fate: Last listed in 1823

General characteristics
- Tons burthen: 290 (bm)
- Complement: 15
- Armament: 1808:16 × 9-pounder guns; 1811:12 × 9-pounder guns; 1813:12 × 4-pounder guns

Argyle was launched in 1807 at Liverpool. She made one voyage as a slave ship just as Britain's involvement in the trans-Atlantic slave trade ended. Afterwards she became a West Indiaman. She then sailed between London and Amsterdam until she was last listed in 1823.

== Career ==
Argyle first appeared in Lloyd's Register in 1807.

Year	Master	Owner	Trade	Source
1807	Crasbreck	James Parr	Liverpool–Africa	LR

Slave voyage (1807–1808): Captain Campbell sailed from Liverpool on 3 May 1807. The Act for the abolition of the slave trade had passed Parliament in March 1807 and took effect on 1 May 1807. However, Argyle had received clearance to sail before the deadline. Thus, when she sailed on 3 May, she did so legally. Argyle acquired slaves at Bonny and arrived at Kingston, Jamaica on 15 December with 296 slaves. She sailed from Kingston on 20 June 1808 and arrived back at Liverpool on 16 August. She had left Liverpool with 46 crew members and she had suffered eight crew deaths on her voyage.

Year	Master	Owner	Trade	Source
1808	Crasbreck; T.Lightly	James Parr; Fairclough	Liverpool–Africa; Jamaica	LR
1811	T.Lightley; J.Affleck	Farclough	Liverpool–Jamaica	LR

Captain John Affleck acquired a letter of marque on 10 December 1811.

Year	Master	Owner	Trade	Source
1813	J.Affleck	Davidson	London–Suriname	LR
1814	J.Affleck	T.Dubruz	Liverpool–Suriname	LR
1818	J.Affleck	T.Dubruz	London–Amsterdam	LR

== Fate ==
Argyle was last listed in 1823.
