= Argyle Airport (disambiguation) =

Argyle Airport is at Lake Argyle, Western Australia, Australia (IATA: GYL, ICAO: YARG).

Argyle Airport may also refer to:

- Argyle Airport (New York) in Argyle, New York, United States (FAA: 1C3)
- Argyle International Airport, St. Vincent & the Grenadines (IATA: SVD, ICAO: TVSA)
