= Stevens Terrace =

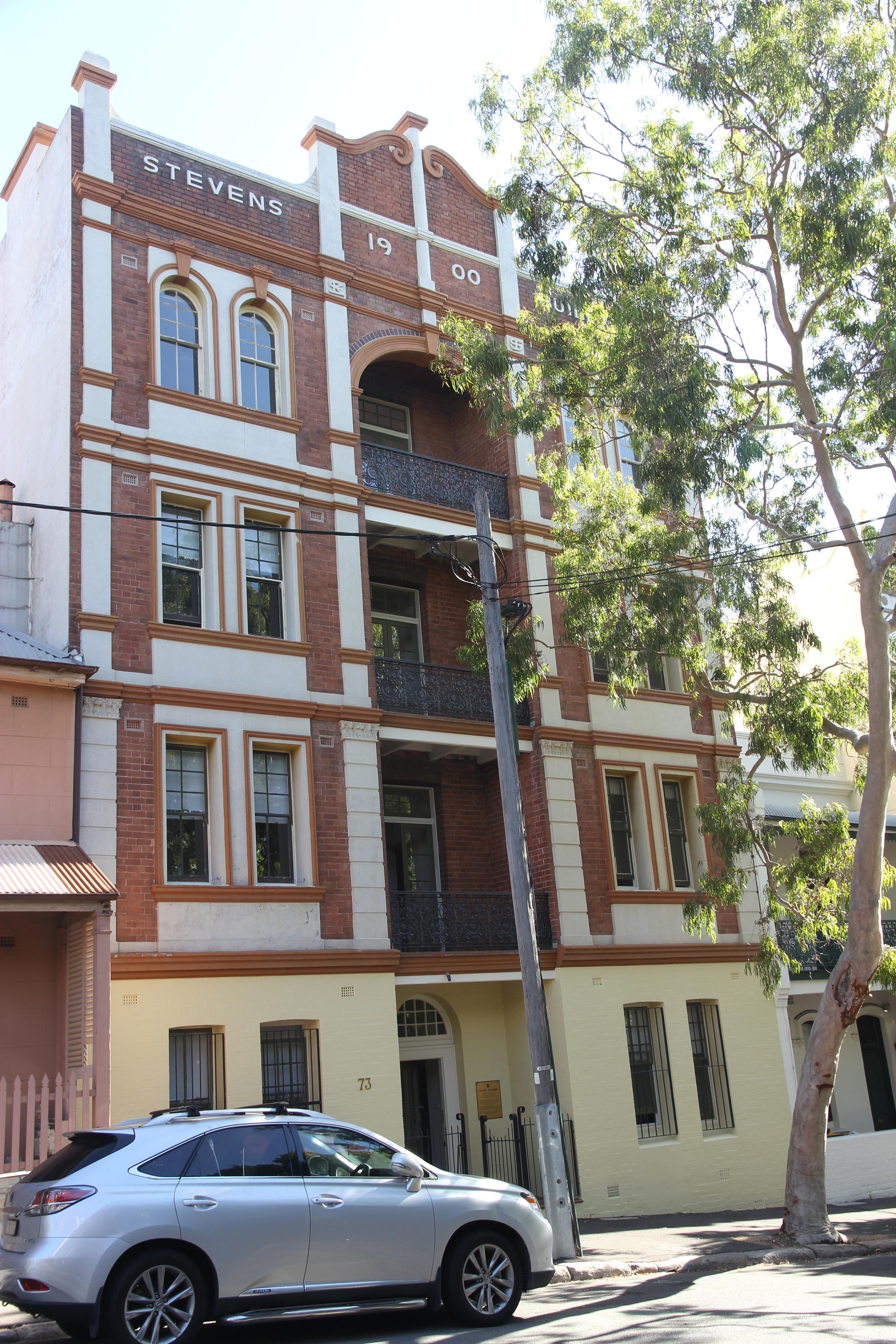
- Stevens Terrace, pictured in 2019.

- Location within Sydney Location within Australia
- 33.8578°S 151.2055°E
- Location: 73 Windmill Street, Millers Point, City of Sydney, New South Wales, Australia

History
- Built: 1900
- Built for: Stevens family

Site notes
- Architect: Joseph Alexander Kethel
- Architectural style: Victorian Italianate

New South Wales Heritage Register
- Official name: Stevens Terrace
- Type: State heritage (built)
- Designated: 2 April 1999
- Reference no.: 862
- Type: Historic site

Stevens Terrace is a heritage-listed former boarding house and now residence located at 73 Windmill Street, in the inner city Sydney suburb of Millers Point in the City of Sydney local government area of New South Wales, Australia. The property was added to the New South Wales State Heritage Register on 2 April 1999.

== History ==
Millers Point is one of the earliest areas of European settlement in Australia, and a focus for maritime activities. This property was built for the Stevens family in 1900 as a high class boarding house, and is possibly the first walkup in Sydney. First tenanted by the NSW Department of Housing in 1982.

== Description ==
Four storey late Victorian apartment building with nine two-bedroom units. Recessed central balconies and an elaborate parapet. Storeys: Four; Construction: Face brick and rendered masonry walls. Corrugated galvanised iron roof. Iron lace balustrades. Painted timber joinery. Original timber stairs replaced with concrete stairs. Style: Victorian Italianate.

The external condition of the property is good.

=== Modifications and dates ===
External: Stairhall roof added later. Last inspected: 23/02/95. Internal: Rehabilitated in 1988 to meet contemporary requirements for fire isolated stairs.

== Heritage listing ==
As at 23 November 2000, this apartment building was built in 1900 for the Stevens family as a high class boarding house, on the site of the former "Live & Let Live Hotel". Possibly the first walkup apartment block in Sydney.

It is part of the Millers Point Conservation Area, an intact residential and maritime precinct. It contains residential buildings and civic spaces dating from the 1830s and is an important example of 19th century adaptation of the landscape.

Stevens Terrace was listed on the New South Wales State Heritage Register on 2 April 1999.

== See also ==
- Australian residential architectural styles
- 71 Windmill Street
- Shipwrights Arms Inn
