= Theodore Argles =

Australian journalist

Theodore Emil Argles (c. 1851 – 9 October 1886) was an Australian journalist described as "amazingly clever and desperately erratic", who wrote under a variety of names, including "Pasquin", "Harold Grey" and "The Pilgrim".

== History ==
Argles was born in England, the son of a Jewish-French solicitor and his English wife, and having come into some money (from parents wishing to be quit of a troublesome son, one commentator suggested), made a tour of Europe and South America before emigrating to Australia, settling first in Victoria, and contributed some anonymous pieces to an Adelaide paper before moving to Sydney and deciding on the life of a journalist.

Between April and October 1877 he wrote a series of articles for Freeman's Journal, under the rubric "Unorthodox Sydney, by a Pilgrim", taking the reader inside Darlinghurst Gaol, Kent Street Refuge, a Sly Grog Shop, the Randwick Asylum for Destitute Children, the Gladesville Hospital for the Insane, the Redfern Benevolent Asylum, Bay View House Lunatic Asylum, the Protestant Refuge for Fallen Women, the Asylum for the Deaf and Dumb and the Blind, and the Hyde Park Asylum for Infirm and Destitute Women. (see External links below for links to the articles)

He was arrested in October 1877 for the theft a month earlier of a gold watch from one Alfred Clarkson during a drinking session, and in January 1878 was sentenced to six months in Maitland jail. His annual, Sum Punkins, modestly self-endorsed as "The best annual ever produced in Australia", went on sale in January, and his satire on journalists, The Devil in Sydney, was published a month later.

In October 1878 he moved to Melbourne, where he wrote a pamphlet "The Pilgrim", which offended some influential people, and he was given a week to leave the Colony, ostensibly under the Influx of Criminals Act, for being in Victoria illegally.

He moved to Adelaide, where in January 1879 his brother Frank Argles was charged with five separate forgery offences, and was sentenced to four years' imprisonment with hard labour. He died in "The Stockade" (Yatala Labor Prison) 2 March 1881. According to "A. Pencil" of the Kapunda Herald, Argles had a malign influence on his younger brother, and both had a terrible affinity for alcohol.

In February 1879 Argles was charged with demanding money with menaces from theatre manager James Allison and with assaulting Frank S. Carroll, proprietor of The Lantern, acquitted of both charges.

A report he wrote, as "The Wanderer", for The Advertiser on the seamy side of Adelaide brought a libel action from Robert Taylor, landlord of the City Hotel on the corner of Hindley and Morphett streets, who felt he had been wronged. After a spirited defence the action failed.

In April 1879 he was reported as having been engaged as editor of the Port Pirie Gazette, but it never eventuated. On the basis of his celebrity, he was invited to appear on stage at White's Rooms in a benefit concert, reading one of his poems.

He returned to Sydney, where, as "Pasquin", he wrote for "Freeman's" another series of sketches, published between February and July 1880, entitled "The Social Kaleidoscope", a phrase echoed by G. R. Sims.

=== The Bulletin ===
The Bulletin was founded in 1880 by J. F. Archibald and John Haynes, who was previously an editor on Samuel Bennett's The Evening News. According to Haynes, Argles simply "drifted onto" the Bulletin staff.

He collaborated with Irish fellow-bohemian Victor Daley in the early Bulletin years as "Pepper and Salt". Both had an irresponsible attitude to life, their wives and to their own well-being. Edwin Caddy made a third participant in a lot of rowdy shenanigans.

In 1881 Archibald, Heaton and Haynes, as proprietors of the Bulletin, were sued by a solicitor, Thomas Robertson, for an article which appeared in the issue of 15 January, and Argles was named by Heaton as its author. No defence was offered, apart from the fact that Robertson had not been named, so only those who knew him would understand the allusion, and Robertson was awarded £1000. It has been asserted that Archibald enjoyed such cases, as they boosted his paper's image. According to Haynes, it was Argles who alerted Robertson to the fact of his mention in the article.

In 1882 Argles wrote an article for a new Sydney journal Society, which Robertson also claimed libelled him. The publisher, Alfred Argles (Note: It is not known whether Alfred Argles, publisher of Society, if not a fiction created for the purpose, is the same person as his uncle, who married one Elizabeth in Adelaide in 1849, had a son Alfred in 1850 and a daughter Harriet in 1851.) issued a fulsome apology, in which he announced dissolution of the partnership with Theo Argles and closure of the publication.

== Family ==
While serving time in Maitland Gaol for the pocket-watch theft, Argles met Harriette Pyne Brown, who was visiting her brother Richard Pyne Brown (born c. 1857), (Note: Confusingly, similarly-named father and son had both been postmasters at East Maitland.) jailed for embezzlement. They married around 1880 and had one child, John Argles born c. June 1885.

He died at Brougham Street, Woolloomooloo after years of suffering from consumption and the effects of heavy drinking, in which absinthe played a part. He had the support of his wife and a host of friends, attracted to him, yet for whom he cared little. John Haynes likened him to a cat:

. . . the incarnation of impishness, pure devilish mischievousness. Yet while not knowing what friendship or fidelity was, he was incapable of wanton vindictiveness . . . He lived in the delight of disturbing somebody's ease.

He was not a church-goer but was attracted to Roman Catholicism and in his last years received frequent visits from the Sisters of Charity of St. Vincent's Convent. He may have expressed a wish to die a Catholic, and Father P. Coonan, of St. Mary's Cathedral, was called in his last hours, but too late to perform the ceremony. His remains were buried in the Waverley Cemetery, close to the grave of Henry Kendall, in compliance with his wishes.

== Publications ==
(as listed in The Oxford Companion to Australian Literature)

- 1877: The Pilgrim pamphlet (8 issues)
- 1878: Another Pilgrim pamphlet (9 issues)
- 1878: Pilgrim pamphlet (9 issues)
- 1878: Sum Punkins
- 1878: My Unnatural Life
- 1878: Scenes in Sydney by Day and Night
- 1878: The Devil in Sydney satirical verses
- 1879: Common Cause (ed.) (Note: No other reference has been found to Common Cause, or to Common Sense as cited by SLSA, both purportedly Adelaide publications.)
- 1879: Pilgrim (pamphlet) in Melbourne
