= Margot Pardoe =

British writer of children's fiction (1902–1996)

Margot Pardoe (8 August 1902 – 5 January 1996) was a British writer of children's fiction under the name M. Pardoe. Her career spanned over 20 years from the late 1930s to the early 1960s. She is known best for the Bunkle adventure series.

Pardoe published over 20 books, most of which were extremely popular as well as positively reviewed. The Times Literary Supplement characterised The Far Island as "realistic as well as charming"; some of her later books were featured on Children's Hour when the part of Bunkle was taken by a young Billie Whitelaw, under the supervision of producer Trevor Hill.

== Life ==
Margot Pardoe's childhood provided her with many of the settings for her books: she was born in London, educated in Hertfordshire and Paris, and had holidays in the continent and remote locations in Britain. She married John Swift in 1934 and settled in Somerset where she began The Far Island. She wrote under her maiden name but only used her first initial, possibly because she had been teased at school about her rhyming name, and possibly because her publisher thought it might help the books appeal to both sexes.

Pardoe and her husband set up a country house hotel called Crossacres which became extremely successful; their only child Philip was born there in 1939. They were forced to sell in 1947, however, when Pardoe almost died from a bout of double pneumonia. During this illness she began to lose her hearing and from her mid-40s was profoundly deaf. In the 1950s they lived with Pardoe's elderly parents in Hampshire. She carried on writing, but her success began to wane at the end of the 1950s, with stories about comfortable middle-class families becoming less popular. Bunkle Brings It Off was her last book in 1961.

John Swift died in 1984; Pardoe lived in Norfolk until 1986 when a fall forced her into a nursing home. She lived there until her death in 1996.

A short article about her was published in the Summer 2004 issue of This England magazine.

== The Far Island ==
M. Pardoe's first book The Far Island introduces readers to Jean and Dick Fraser, adventure-loving and sophisticated children who have been used to spending their holidays at luxurious foreign resorts. They suffer a culture shock when sent to Mora Island in Orkney by their great-grandmother, but gradually adjust to the new circumstances, and end up discovering the secret of the island. These characters reappear in the Bunkle series of books for which the author is best known.

== Bunkle series ==
There are twelve books in the Bunkle series. Billy de Salis, known as Bunkle because according to his siblings he talks a lot of "bunk", is the youngest of three children of a British Secret Service Agent. The adventures of Bunkle, his brother Robin and his sister Jill include hunting down spies, smugglers, poachers and sinister scientists.

Pardoe's books are in many ways similar to other books of that era: as in Enid Blyton's stories, children have adventures free from supervision; as in Arthur Ransome's Swallows and Amazons series, these often take place in a rural setting. However, there are some differences which set Pardoe's books, and the Bunkle series in particular, apart. The children do not live in a vacuum; unlike Blyton's St Clare's series, World War II is mentioned (with the associated inconveniences of rationing and black-out), and the children also age. Bunkle is ten when the first book starts and ages gradually until the last but one volume, before returning to his original age in the last adventure which is hard to find owing to a short print run; his brother joins the army and his sister is married in the course of the series.

== Argle series ==
The Argle books feature the MacAlister children and their tutor in three time slip adventures. In Argle's Mist they travel through time to Celtic Britain, in Argle's Causeway to Norman England, and in Argle's Oracle to classical Greece.

== Published books ==
Bunkle series

- Four Plus Bunkle (1939)
- Bunkle Began It (1942)
- Bunkle Butts In (1943)
- Bunkle Bought It (1945)
- Bunkle Breaks Away (1947)
- Bunkle and Belinda (1948)
- Bunkle Baffles Them (1949)
- Bunkle Went for Six (1950)
- Bunkle Gets Busy (1951)
- Bunkle's Brainwave (1952)
- Bunkle Scents a Clue (1953)
- Bunkle Brings It Off (1961)

Argle series

- Argle's Mist (1956); US title, Curtain of Mist
- Argle's Causeway (1958)
- Argle's Oracle (1959)

Other

- The Far Island (1936)
- The Ghost Boat (1961)
- The Boat Seekers (1953)
- Charles Arriving (1954)
- May Madrigal (1955)
- The Dutch Boat (1955)
- The Nameless Boat (1957)
- The Greek Boat Mystery (1960)
