= Argyle Building =

Argyle Building may refer to:

- Argyle Building, Glasgow, in Scotland
- Argyle Building (Kansas City, Missouri), listed on the U.S. National Register of Historic Places
