= Argyle House, Newcastle =

Argyle House
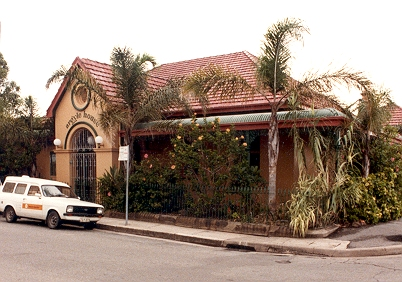
- Argyle House when it was known as Fanny's Tavern

- Location within New South Wales Location within Australia
- 32.9257°S 151.7752°E
- Location: Argyle Street, Newcastle, City of Newcastle, New South Wales, Australia

History
- Built: 1860–

Site notes
- Architect(s): Menkens and Castleden. Designer of original cottage unknown.
- Owner: MORU Properties Pty Ltd

New South Wales Heritage Register
- Official name: Fanny's Tavern; Argyle House & Site; Australian Agricultural Company Headquarters
- Type: state heritage (built)
- Designated: 2 April 1999
- Reference no.: 315
- Type: Inn/Tavern
- Category: Commercial

Argyle House is a heritage-listed former office building and now nightclub at Argyle Street, Newcastle, in the Hunter region of New South Wales, Australia. It was built from 1860. It was also known as the Australian Agricultural Company Headquarters. It was added to the New South Wales State Heritage Register on 2 April 1999.

== History ==
This complex of buildings has grown over about 125 years. The original building is believed to date from the 1860s. A second building, joined by a covered way, was designed by Frederick Menkens and built 1903. Additions to this second building were designed by Frederick Menkens and F. G. Castleden in 1907, and by Castleden in 1909 and 1919. Castleden also designed a third essentially separate building in 1912. Recent flat roofed additions served as basic accommodation for the nightclub function. A caretaker's cottage to the west of the existing buildings, designed by Castleden in 1912, was demolished c. 1970. The complex served as the regional headquarters of the Australian Agricultural Company for many years: the company held a monopoly over coalmining in the Newcastle area from 1829 to 1847, but retaining mining and commercial interests in the district long after that. The complex has subsequently been used as a nightclub, for many years under the name of Fanny's Tavern before reverting to the building's original name of Argyle House in February 2013.

In December 2021, an outbreak of the Omicron COVID-19 variant occurred at Argyle House, and resulted in thousands of cases of COVID-19 in the Hunter Region.

== Description ==
This large complex of buildings, linked in pavilion fashion, covers the entire property and is built to each of the three street alignments. Internal alterations and modern infill development on the Centenary Road side and the Argyle Street corner have been made to adapt the building complex for night club use. All buildings are rendered and painted light cream with label moulds and other features in contrasting colours.

The original 1860s building is the most architecturally interesting. It has a high pitched roof with recent terracotta tiles and a narrow boxed eaves, and wall construction is rendered masonry with large stone sills to the window openings. This building is symmetrical to the Argyle Street frontage, where there is a central gabled porch with a central circular timber louvred ventilator surrounded by a raised circle matching the semicircular label mould over the entrance arch. The wide verandah, on both street frontages, has a bullnose corrugated iron roof, cast iron posts, and interesting wrought iron fringe and brackets wrought iron. Exposed rafters on the verandah are curved to follow the bullnose. The section of the verandah south of the entrance has been filled in with boarding, but this would be easy to remove. The verandah floor is asphalt over flagging, while a wrought iron fence with dagger tops and on a rounded stone plinth runs right around the verandah. There is an original double gate matching the fence. Double doors on the western end of the verandah where it abuts another building may be original. Windows are simple double sash, single paned. Wrought iron ventilator grills are a feature. Stone steps form the porch are now tiled and probably raised form their original level. The other early buildings are in keeping with the original one and are joined to it by various additions.

The 1912 Castleden building, also fronting Wharf Street has bosses and anchoring points, possibly for a former awning. There is evidence that there was originally a verandah between these two building to match that of the 1860s building. This latter building also has a hipped roof. There is a part hipped, part gabled roof with boxed eaves to the Menkens 1903/Castleden 1909 building. The 1903 Menkens section has two tall, rendered chimneys. Window openings on the Centenary Road facade of the 1909 additions are very plain, the large windows are double sash, single pane. Large exhaust fans and associated ducting mar the roofs of the 1903-09 section and the original building, but could easily be removed. The recent infill sections have lower, flat corrugated iron roofs with a bullnose to street frontages. While there is some original joinery, the interiors have been largely altered and compromised.

The condition of the complex was reported as being fair to good as at 13 December 2001. Various additions and alterations have been made (e.g. The terracotta roof tiles and possibly the gabled porch on the east side). These do not reduce the historic significance of the building. They do detract from the integrity of the structure as an historic artifact.

=== Modifications and dates ===
- 1860s – Original building built
- 1903 – A second building, joined by a covered way, was designed by Frederick Menkens and built
- 1907 – Additions to this second building were designed by Menkens and F G Castleden, and by Castleden in 1909 and 1919.
- 1912 – Castleden also designed a third essentially separate building.
- c. 1970 — Recent flat roofed additions served as basic accommodation for the nightclub function. A caretaker's cottage to the west of the existing buildings, designed by Castleden in 1912, was demolished

== Heritage listing ==
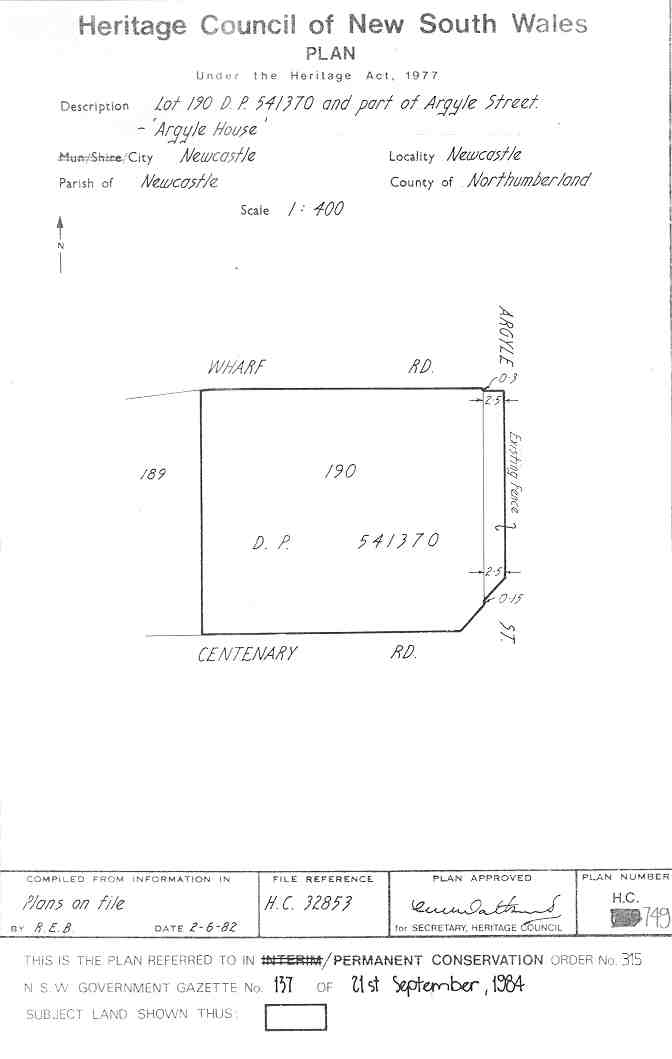
Heritage boundaries

Argyle House is a very good example of an early Victorian cottage (the original 1860s building) that has developed with the addition of many sympathetic buildings in a pavilion style of growth. It is thought to be the oldest surviving structure on this site. It may contain valuable evidence of early building practices and materials. The building has important associations with the Australian Agricultural Company, a principal influence in the early development of Newcastle and the Coal Mining Industry. The only known surviving structure, apart from the pier remnant from the iron bridge, of the early operations of the A.A Coy in the CBD. Argyle House has important associations with the prominent architects Menkens and Castleden.

Argyle House was listed on the New South Wales State Heritage Register on 2 April 1999 having satisfied the following criteria.

The place is important in demonstrating the course, or pattern, of cultural or natural history in New South Wales.

This item is historically significant because it represents a good example of an early Victorian cottage. The building has important associations with the Australian Agricultural Company (as a former headquarters), a principal influence in the early development of Newcastle and the Coal Mining Industry by making it the centre of its agricultural and mining pursuits in the Hunter Valley.

The place has a strong or special association with a person, or group of persons, of importance of cultural or natural history of New South Wales's history.

Argyle House has important associations with the prominent architects Menkens and Castleden.

The place is important in demonstrating aesthetic characteristics and/or a high degree of creative or technical achievement in New South Wales.

The notable features of the original buildings which remain include the verandah roof framing; cast-iron verandah posts and decoration; the cast iron picket fence (altered); much window joinery; some door architraves; a few doors and fanlights; some original skirtings; some plaster ceilings and cornices; at least one original fire surround; the 1907 strong room door (relocated) and possibly the original verandah sandstone paving underneath the existing finishes.

The place has strong or special association with a particular community or cultural group in New South Wales for social, cultural or spiritual reasons.

The main cultural significance of the property relates to its associations with the Australian Agricultural Company, the architects Menken and Castleden and its prominent position in the early development of Newcastle.
