= Personnel of the Shackleton–Rowett Expedition =

1921–22 Antarctic explorers

The crew of the Quest at the start of the expedition

The Shackleton–Rowett Expedition, 1921–22, was the last Antarctic expedition led by Sir Ernest Shackleton. Proposed as an ambitious two-year programme of Antarctic exploration it was curtailed by the death of Shackleton and the inadequacies of the expedition's ship, Quest. Under the command of Frank Wild several attempts were made to break through the Antarctic pack ice, but the expedition was never able to proceed further than longitude 20°E. On the crew's return to Cape Town to refit in preparation for the second term they were ordered home. The crew of the Quest comprised 24 members in all, but only 19 were on board for the start of the Antarctic portion (Hussey accompanied Shackleton's body when it was put on board a ship for England, and Eriksen, Mooney and Bee-Mason had left before the ship reached South Georgia). Gerald Lysaght, a yachtsman, accompanied the crew from Plymouth to Cape Verde.

Image	Name	Born	Died	Position	Additional information
	Sir Ernest Shackleton	1874	1922	Commander	Died on South Georgia during the expedition
	Frank Wild	1873	1939	2nd in Command	Took command of the expedition on Shackleton's death. Had served as 2nd in Command on Shackleton's Imperial Trans-Antarctic Expedition
	Frank Worsley	1872	1943	Captain of Quest	Formerly Captain of Endurance during the Imperial Trans-Antarctic Expedition
	Alexander Kerr	1892	1964	Engineer	Served as 2nd Engineer on the Imperial Trans-Antarctic Expedition
	James McIlroy	1879	1968	Surgeon/Meteorologist	Veteran of the Imperial Trans-Antarctic Expedition
	Alexander Macklin	1889	1967	Surgeon/In charge of stores and equipment	Veteran of the Imperial Trans-Antarctic Expedition
	Leonard Hussey	1891	1964	Meteorologist/Assistant Surgeon	Accompanied Shackleton's body to Montevideo and then back to South Georgia, so was not present for most of the expedition. Veteran of the Imperial Trans-Antarctic Expedition
	Charles Green	1888	1974	Cook	Veteran of the Imperial Trans-Antarctic Expedition
	Thomas McLeod	1869	1960	Able seaman	Veteran of the Imperial Trans-Antarctic Expedition
	Roderick Carr	1891	1971	Pilot	Assisted with scientific work as the expedition's plane was unserviceable
	James Dell	c.1880	1968	Electrician, Boatswain	Had been with Shackleton on the Discovery Expedition
	Hubert Wilkins	1888	1958	Biologist	
	George Vibert Douglas	1892	1958	Geologist	Born in Montreal, Canada. Professor of Geology, Dalhousie University (1932-1957)
	James Marr	1902	1965	Boy Scout	With Mooney was selected from 1,700 Scouts who applied to accompany the expedition
	Norman Mooney	c.1904		Boy Scout	Left the ship at Madeira after suffering chronic seasickness
	Douglas George Jeffrey	1885	1972	Navigator	Had been intended for the original crew on the Imperial Trans-Antarctic Expedition, but when war broke out on the eve of Endurance's departure he felt compelled to stay in England to sign up.
	Eriksen			Harpoon expert	Returned home when the Quest put in at Rio de Janeiro for repairs
	John Charles Bee-Mason	c.1875	1957	Photographer	Left the ship at Madeira after suffering chronic seasickness
	C. E. Smith			2nd Engineer	
	Harold Watts			Wireless Operator	
	G. H. Ross			Stoker	
	Sydney Smith Young			Stoker	Joined the expedition in Rio de Janeiro
	Harold Arthur Argles	1899	1929	Stoker	Joined the expedition in Rio de Janeiro.
	Christopher Naisbitt			Cook's assistant	Joined the expedition in Rio de Janeiro
	Query (dog)	1920/21	1922	Mascot	Washed overboard and drowned on June 9, 1922
	Questie (cat)	1921		Mascot	A kitten presented to the expedition by the Daily Mail
