= Argyle Shore Provincial Park =

Provincial park on Prince Edward Island, Canada

Coordinates: 46°9′50.8″N 63°21′49.1″W

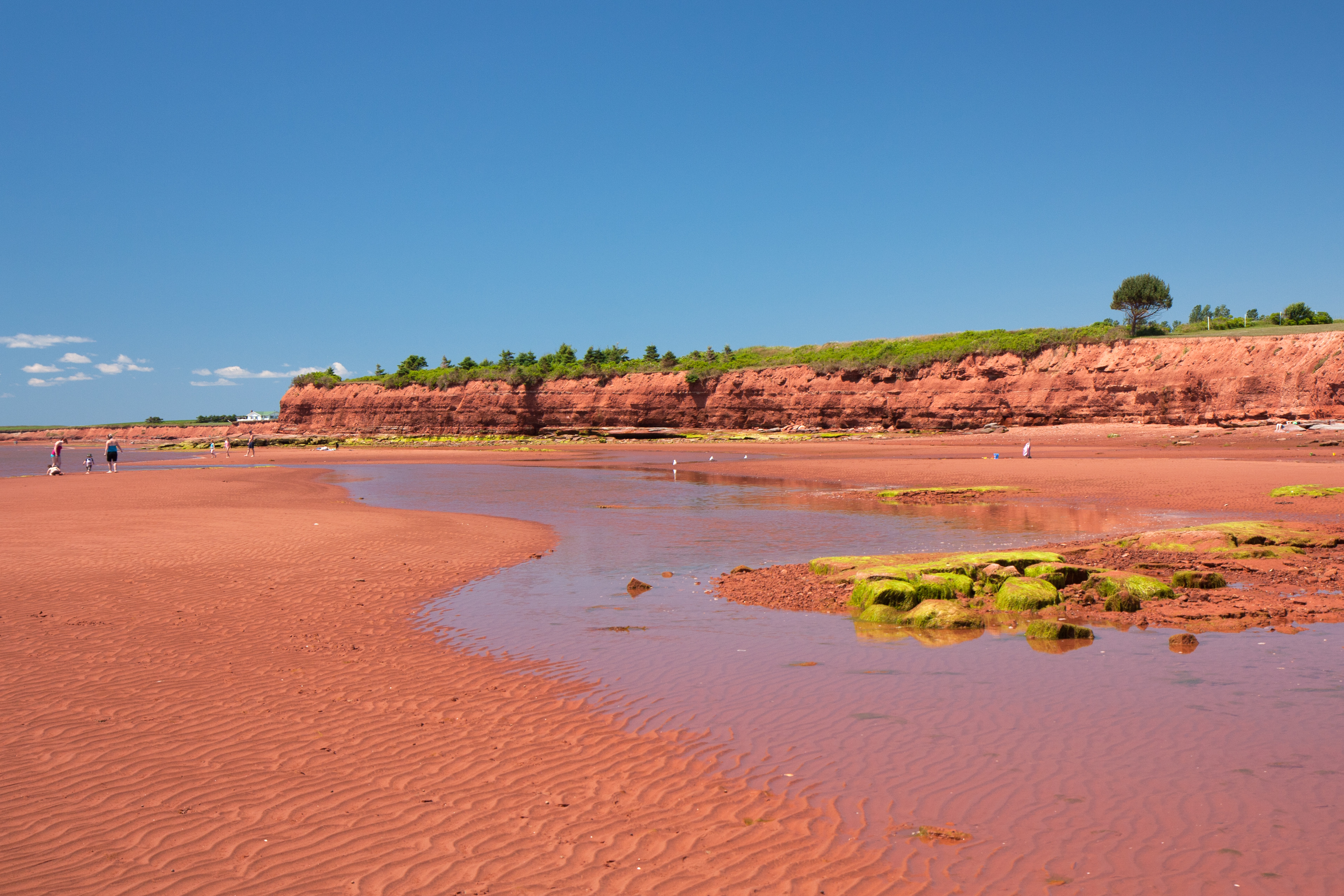
- Interactive map of Argyle Shore Provincial Park
- Location: Prince Edward Island, Canada
- Area: 9.59 ha (23.7 acres)
- Established: 1961

Argyle Shore Provincial Park is a provincial park on Prince Edward Island, Canada. It opened in 1961 and is 9.59 ha. The park's name comes from the area's early 19th-century settlers from Argyle Shire, Scotland.
