= Scullery maid =

Lowest-ranked female domestic servant

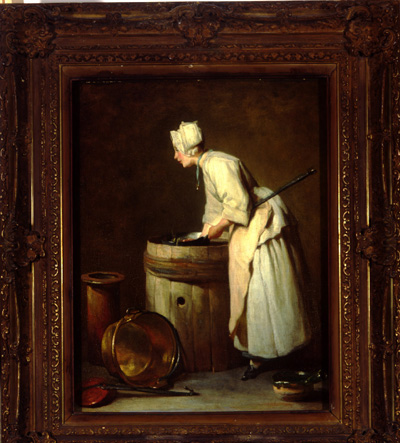
Oil painting of a scullery maid by Jean-Siméon Chardin

In great houses, scullery maids were the lowest-ranked and often the youngest of the female domestic servants and acted as assistants to a kitchen maid.

== Description ==
The scullery maid reported (through the kitchen maid) to the cook or chef. Along with the junior kitchen maid, the scullery maid did not eat at the communal servants' dining hall table, but in the kitchen in order to keep an eye on the food that was still cooking.

Duties of the scullery maid included the most physical and demanding tasks in the kitchen such as cleaning and scouring the floor, stoves, sinks, pots, and dishes. After scouring the plates in the scullery, she would leave them on racks to dry. The scullery maid also assisted in cleaning vegetables, plucking fowl, and scaling fish.

== The Book of Household Management ==
The duties of the scullery-maid are to assist the cook; to keep the scullery clean, and all the metallic as well as earthenware kitchen utensils.

The position of scullery-maid is not, of course, one of high rank, nor is the payment for her services large. But if she be fortunate enough to have over her a good kitchen-maid and clever cook, she may very soon learn to perform various little duties connected with cooking operations, which may be of considerable service in fitting her for a more responsible place. Now, it will be doubtless thought by the majority of our readers, that the fascinations connected with the position of the scullery-maid, are not so great as to induce many people to leave a comfortable home in order to work in a scullery.

—Mrs. Beeton, The Book of Household Management, published 1861

== Additional duties ==
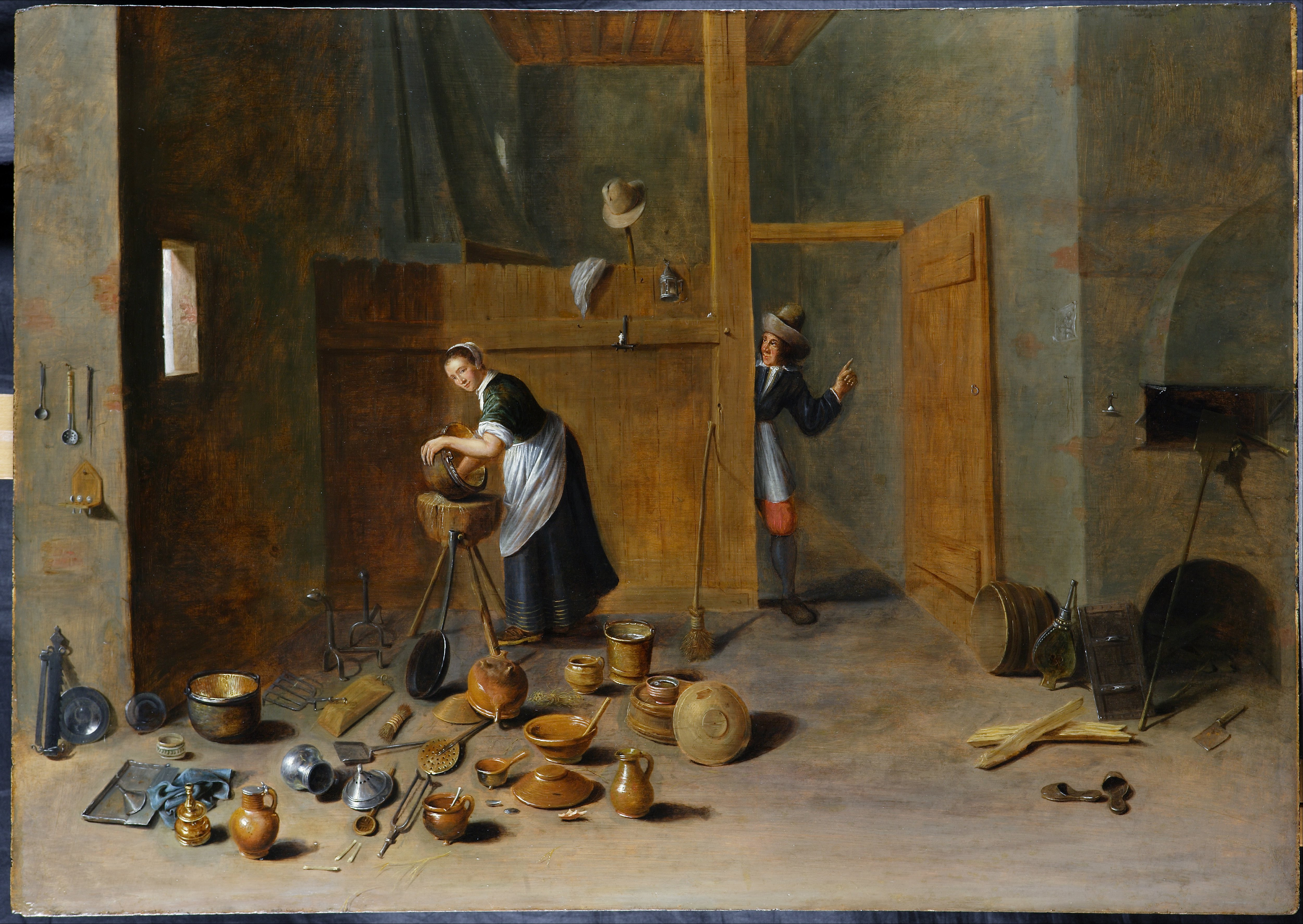
Scullery maids cleaned metallic and earthenware kitchen utensils, but not fine china, stemware, crystal or plate silver.

The scullery maid provided hot water for the scullery, kitchen tasks, and household. In addition to her other tasks, the scullery maid had to keep the scullery clean by clearing away meat and vegetable garbage, scrubbing work tables, and swilling the floors. The water was carried through a drain outside the house. Scullery maids would rarely have handled fine china, stemware, crystal or plate silver; these were cleaned by housemaids and footmen. Before the advent of central heating systems, scullery maids were required to light the fires on the kitchen stove and supply hot water for tea and washing. She performed these tasks in the morning before the cook came down to the kitchens.

In a household with no between maid, the scullery maid may also have waited on staff in the servants' hall, although this may have been assigned to another maid or a junior footman. In the days before the indoor water closet, she may have been required to empty and clean the servants' chamber pots as well.

This work has, in modern (i.e. the nineteenth century) times, primarily been performed by women, but in medieval households female domestics were relatively rare. A male servant performing the tasks described above would be called a scullion. In 1386, when the English Parliament requested the removal of certain of Richard II's ministers, the king infamously responded that he would not dismiss so much as a scullion from his kitchen at parliament's request.

The root of the word scullery is the 1300–50 French word "escuelerie" (pronounced squillerye < equivalent to escuele -dish (< L scutella, dim. of scutra pan) + rie -ry.

== Fictional scullery maids ==
=== Fairy Tales ===
- The title character of Cap-o'-Rushes
- The title character of Catskin
- The title character of Katie Woodencloak
- The title character of Mossycoat
- The title character of Allerleirauh
- The title character of Donkeyskin
- The title character of Catherine and Her Destiny
- The heroine of The Fish and the Ring
- The title character of Maid Maleen
- The prince of Iron Hans, as a scullion

=== Other Works ===
- Becky in the 1905 children's novel A Little Princess
- Snow White in the 1937 film Snow White and the Seven Dwarfs
- Katerina in the 1938 film The Girl Downstairs
- Cinderella in the 1950 film Cinderella
- Lavinia in the 1970 children's novel Thursday's Child
- Ruby Finch in the 1971–1975 television series Upstairs, Downstairs
- Annette in the 1973 novel The Princess Bride
- Evangeline in the 2005 film Nanny McPhee
- Arabella in the 2006 children's novel Rebel's Daughter: The 1837 Rebellion Diary of Arabella Stevenson
- Lady Tremaine and Drizella in the 2007 film Cinderella III: A Twist in Time
- Daisy Mason in the 2010–2015 television series Downton Abbey
- Demelza Poldark (née Carne) in the 2015–2019 British television series Poldark
- Bridget in the 2016 animated film Trolls
- Robyn in the 2020 animated film Wolfwalkers
- Bridget in the 2022 TV series, The Gilded Age
- Elora Danan in the 2022 TV series, Willow

== See also ==
- Hall boy
- List of obsolete occupations
