= Between maid =

Female domestic worker

A between maid (nickname tweeny, also called hall girl particularly in the United States) was a female junior domestic worker in a large household with many staff. The position became largely defunct in the 20th century, as few households needed or could afford great retinues of domestic workers with the elaborate hierarchy of the past.

== Description ==
Between maids were roughly equivalent to scullery maids (dishwashers, floor scrubbers, oven minders, etc.). The term hall girl came from her chief duty, which was waitressing in the servants' hall. The term between maid came from the fact that her duties were split between the area of responsibilities of the housekeeper, butler and cook. If those individuals did not like one another, the job of the between maid was a very difficult one.

A between maid was required to set the table and remove the dishes, as well as waiting at table. She may also have carried meals up to the head housekeeper, if that head of staff had breakfast or afternoon tea in her room(s). A between maid should not be confused with a parlour maid, though both maids had similar household duties. Parlour maids cleaned and tidied reception rooms and living areas in the mornings, and often served refreshments at afternoon tea, as well as sometimes serving dinner. They tidied studies and libraries and, with footmen, answered bells calling for service.

== See also ==
- Hall boy
- List of obsolete occupations
