= Useful man =

Male domestic worker

A useful man or houseman is a male domestic worker ranking below a footman but above a hall boy.

Unlike the footman, the useful man never enters the dining room or waits personally on the master of the house. The term houseman should be distinguished from houseboy—a male domestic worker of lesser rank.

== See also ==
- Great house
