= Still room maid =

Female domestic servant

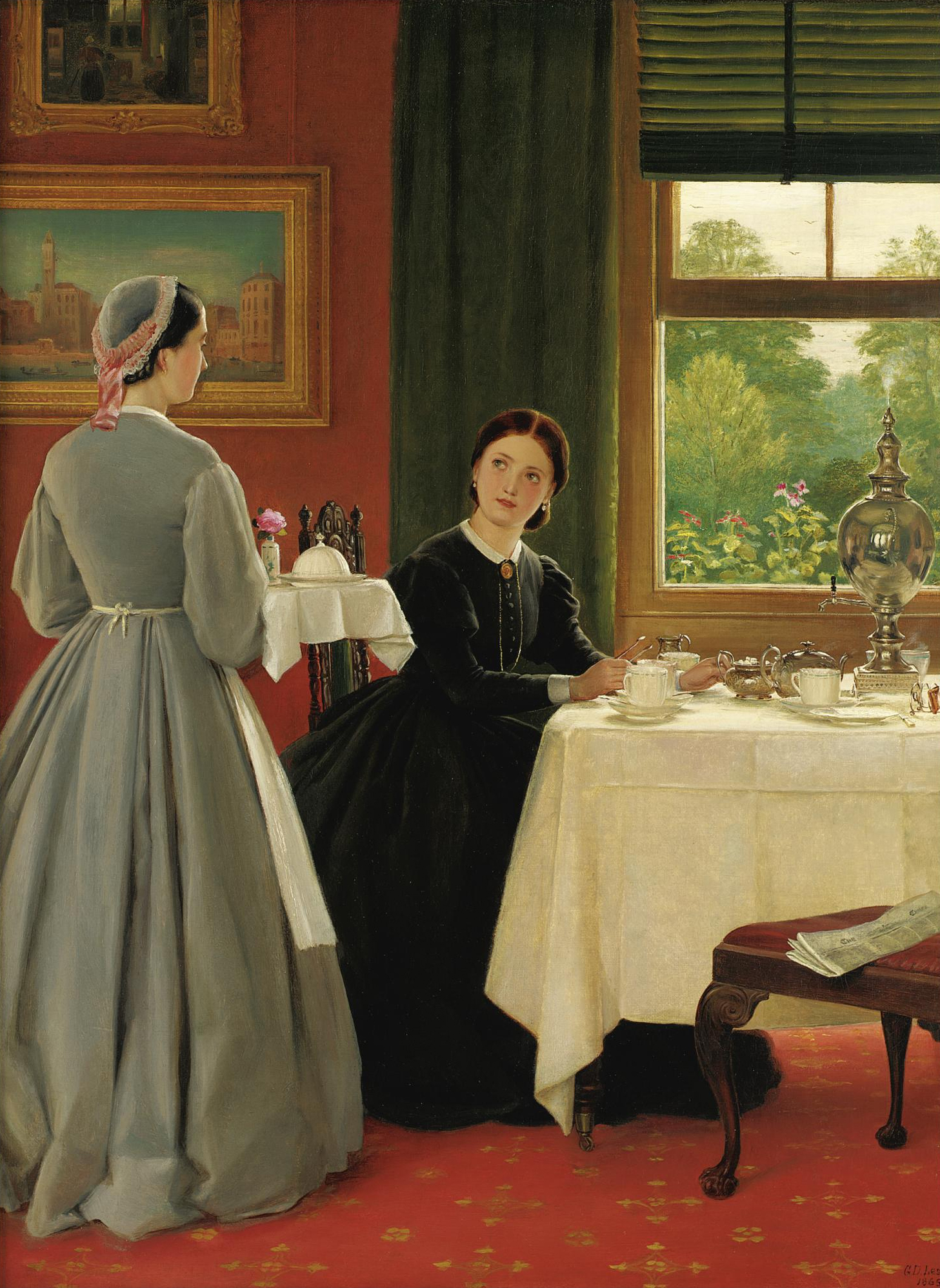
A stillroom maid (presumably), serving afternoon tea.

The still-room maid is a female servant who works in the still room, a functional room in a great house. She made preserves, including pickled eggs and vegetables, dried fruit, dried herbs and flowers, spice preparations, chutneys, marmalades, and jams; beverages, such as tea, bottled drinks, and beer; and perfumes, candles, and home remedies. (Note: home remedies, drinks, oils; later jams, preserves, pickles, gherkins, bottled drinks, and alcohols herbal waters, teas, dried flowers and herbs, cologne, toilet water, medicines, candles, and mixing of spices beers, cakes, pastries, jams, chutneys, marmelades, and pickles) She also prepared and served afternoon tea; not just the beverages, but sandwiches and cakes.

The still-room maid is a junior servant, and as a member of the between staff, reports to both the housekeeper and the cook. It was a high-status role; stillroom maids were often promoted to housekeepers. In smaller households, the housekeeper would do the work in the stillroom herself, and the stillroom sometimes adjoins the housekeeper's room. Like the housekeeper, the stillroom maid was often exempted from wearing a uniform, after uniforms became common.

The work of the still-room was originally done by the lady of the house, and later by more junior ladies of the household. It then passed to the housekeeper or cook, and thence to the stillroom maid(s). Once common in houses with large staffs, the still-room maid is rare in the 21st century.
