= Still room =

Room for preparing household components

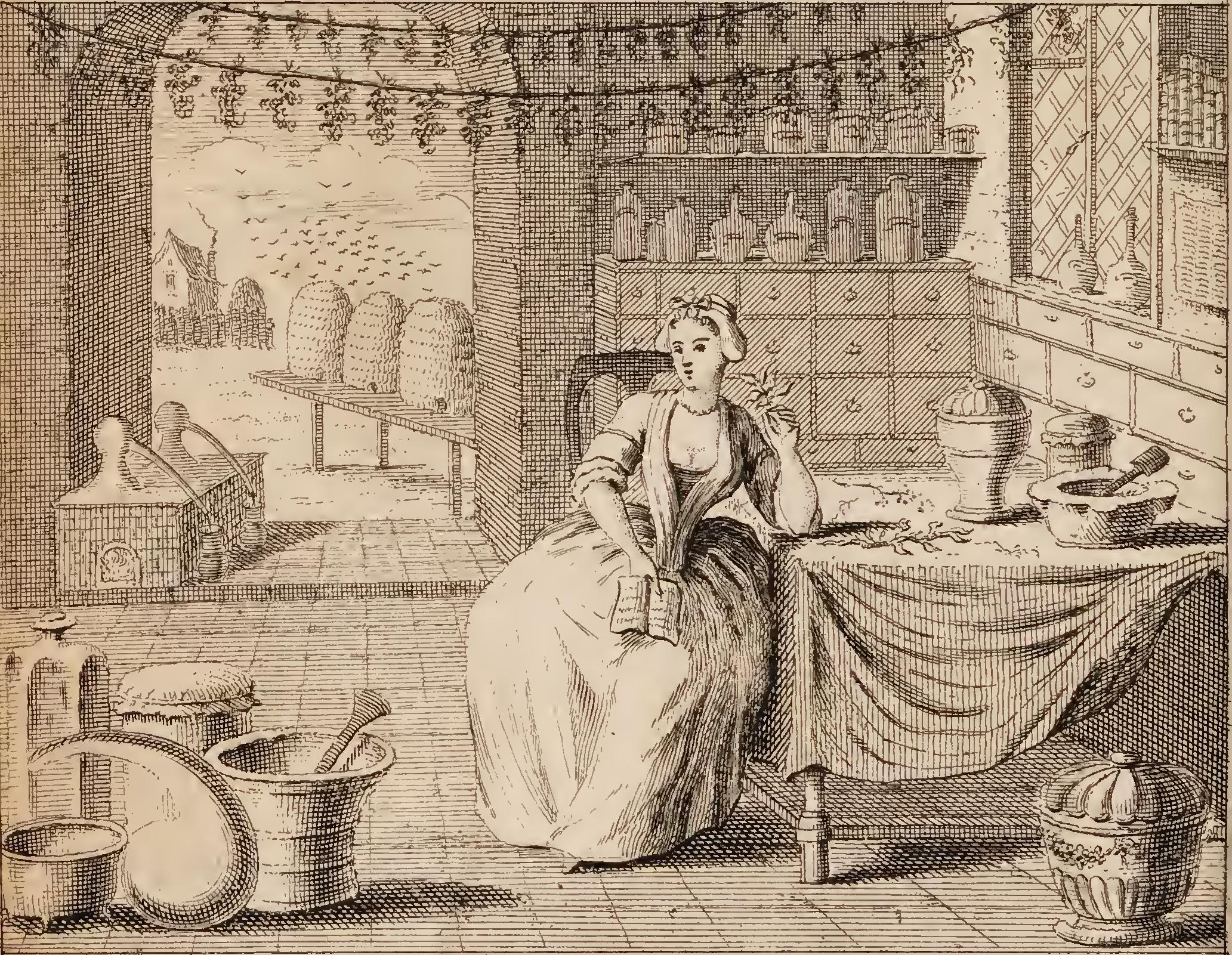
A stillroom in a household manual of 1742, with hanging herbs, mortars and pestles, alembics, sealed jars, many drawers, a small library, a stove near the door, and a row of bee skeps outside

A still room (or stillroom or cafeterie) is a room for preparing household compounds, found in most great houses, castles or large establishments throughout Europe, dating back at least to medieval times. Stillrooms were used to make products as varied as candles, furniture polish, and soap; distillery was only one of the tasks carried out there.

The still room was a working room, part chemistry lab, part compounding pharmacy, part perfumery, part beverage factory, and part kitchen. Professional manufacturers such as dispensing chemists and apothecaries gradually took over many still-room tasks, producing the products of the still-room commercially. With the commercialization of preserved food the use of stillrooms for food preservation also declined.

== Medieval use ==
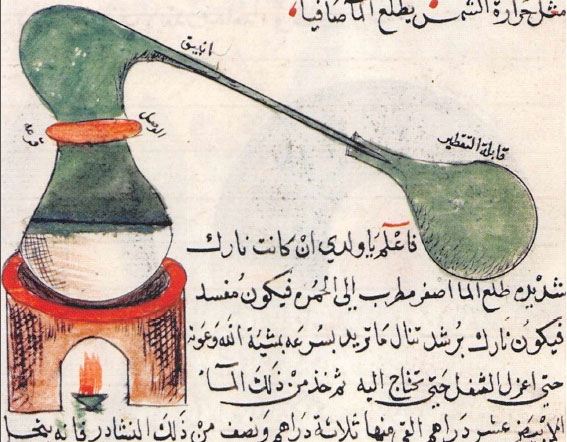
A still, A.D. 766, illustrating Jabir Ibn Hayyan.

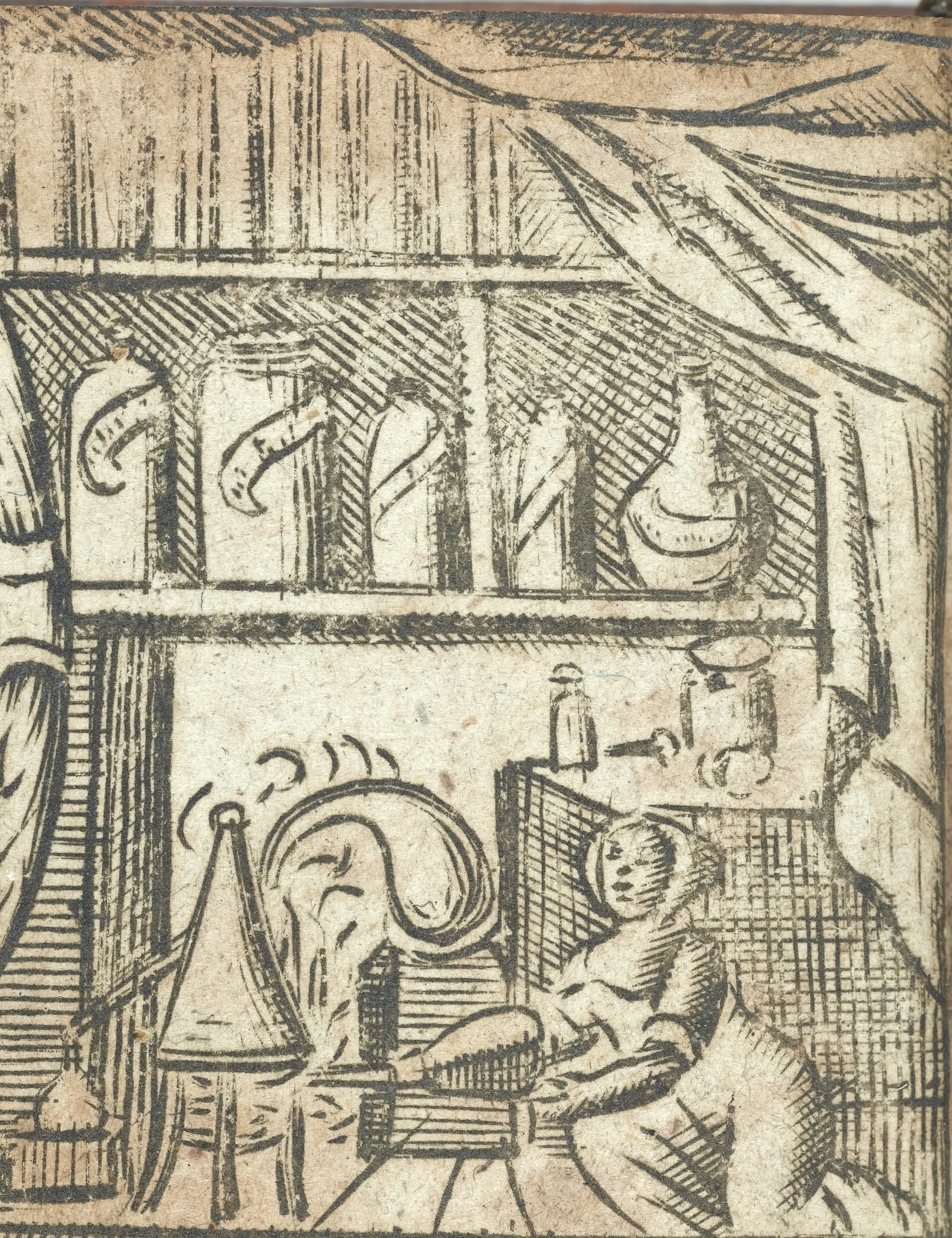
A woman at work in a stillroom, from The Accomplished Ladies' Rich Closet of Rarities, or, the Ingenious Gentlewoman and Servant-maids Delightful Companion, 1691.

Originally, the still room was a very important part of the household. The lady of the house was in charge of the room, and she taught her daughters and wards some of the skills needed to run their own homes in order to make them more marriageable. As practical skills fell out of fashion for high-born women, the still room became the province of poor dependent relations.

Households relied on medieval food preservation, much of which was done in the stillroom, to provide varied food through the winter.

Medieval households also made many perfumes, such as rosewater, and powders made from orris root, lavender, and calamus; they also dried and used meadowsweet, germander, hyssop, rosemary, thyme, violet, and woodruff.

The literate hand-wrote their own collections of stillroom recipes, often mixed with other practical household knowledge. These receipt-books were often amended from experience, and were valued, and bequeathed in wills. While these books were very individual compilations, the recipes from these books largely remained similar during the medieval period; the contents changed little over the centuries. These collections were often collaborative, multi-authored collections of useful practical knowledge, a "family book" like a family Bible.

== Renaissance use ==
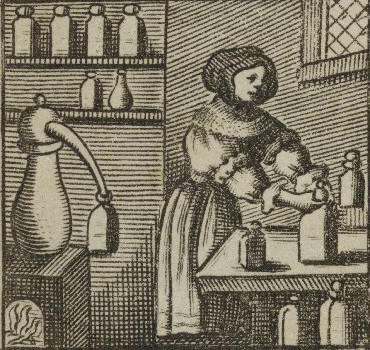
A still room of 1670, from The Queen-Like Closet. Filling and stoppering bottles of distillate.

A still room in a Renaissance great house would be equipped with distillation equipment, and a waist-high brazier or chafing dish. There might well be an adjoining stove room, with a small stove and slatted shelves for drying.

Spirits, wines, syrups, and waters were distilled. Other products included pickled vegetables and fruit, laundry recipes, remedies, and perfumes, and home-brewed beer or wine was often made. Herbs and flowers from the kitchen garden and surrounding countryside were preserved for flavoring food and processed tinctures, distillates, and syrups. Other products included ointments, soaps, furniture polishes, and a wide variety of medicines.

Sugar became widely available to the upper classes in the Renaissance. Renaissance houses made many sugary conceits, such as cordials (beverage syrups), comfits (candy-coated nuts and spices), spiced sugar candies, candied fruit and plants, preserved in syrups, fruit jellies, fruit conserves, quince pastes, marmalades, and crumb gingerbreads.

Printing meant that book availability, and literacy rates, rose. Stillroom recipes were more commonly written down (along with other information, like general food recipes, family medical histories, unit conversion tables, and encyclopedic lists, often all in the same book), by women and men of the household, including nobility and some literate servants, and bequeathed. These books (sometimes called "closets") were also copied, so that multiple siblings could have a copy, and friends and family sent one another individual recipes. Some receipt-books were also made to be published (see Still room#See also for a selection). Recipes from printed books were often copied into home-made manuscript collections, and recipes from manuscripts were collected for print, causing a drastic increase in the pace of innovation. Manuscript recipes change little from 1200 to 1500, but subsequently they change every 40–50 years.

During this period, medicines were increasingly purchased, not home-made.

== Later uses ==
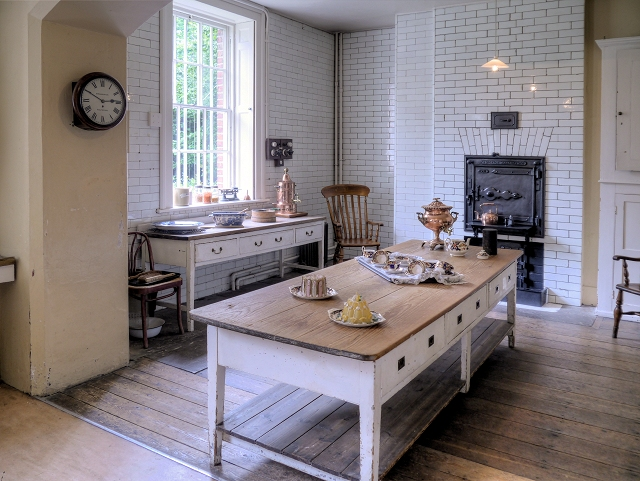
Still room at Tatton Hall, England, 1770s-1810. It contains a cake, a jelly, the china for afternoon tea, and beverage-making apparatus.

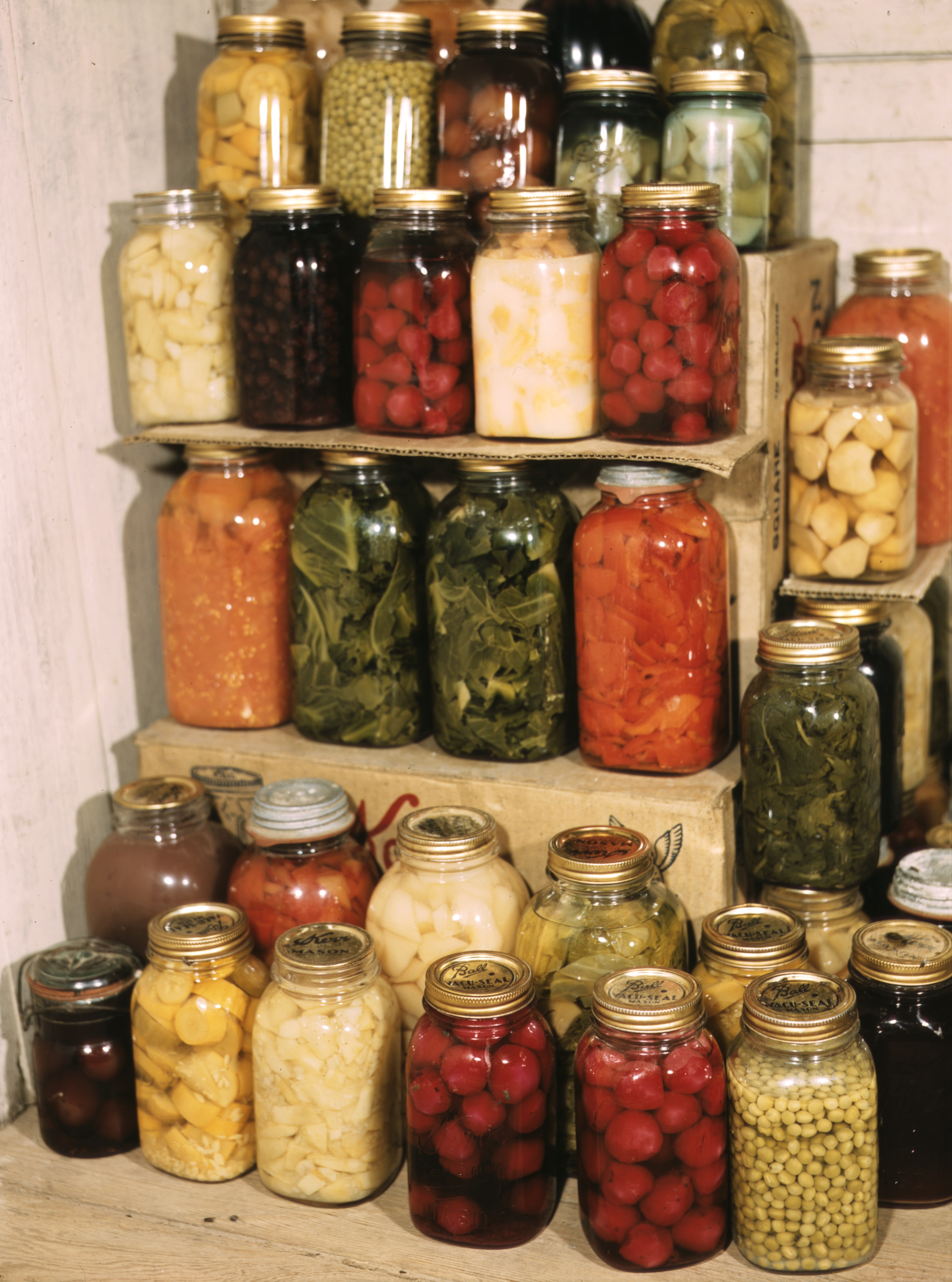
Canning jars full of preserved vegetables, fruits, and pulses. Canning in glass was invented in 1809, and was often, like earlier food-preservation work, done in the stillroom. Tin cans and steel cans were invented soon after, and became commercially significant mid-century. World War I drastically boosted steel can production and cut costs.

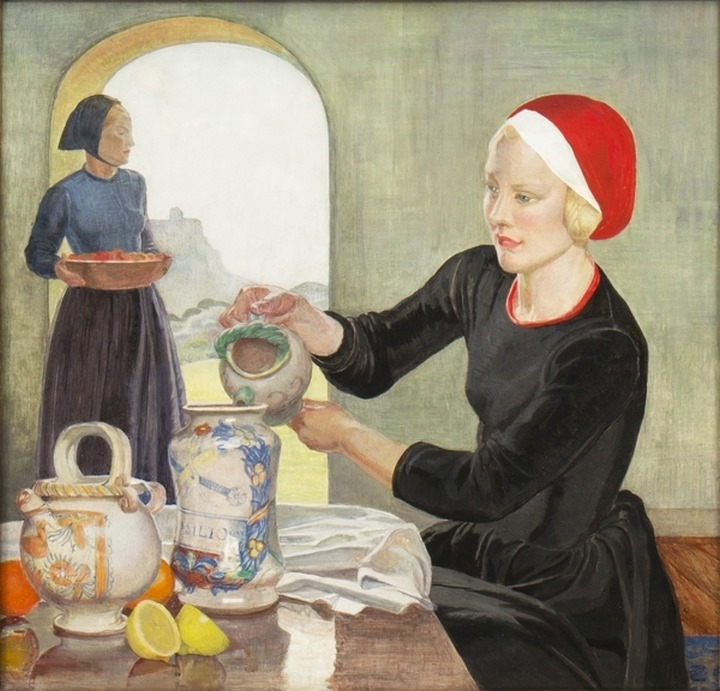
"The Still Room", by Averil Burleigh, 1928

In later years, as physicians and apothecaries became more widely spread and the products of the still room became commercially available, the still room increasingly became an adjunct of the kitchen. The use of the still room gradually diminished to making only preserves, jellies, and home-brewed beverages, and it became a store room for perishables such as cakes.

The stillroom was used to make preserves including pickled eggs and vegetables, fermented vegetables and vinegars, dried foods, dried herbs and flowers, spice preparations, canned vegetables and chutneys, marmalades, and jams; beverages, such as tea, bottled drinks, and beer; and perfumes, candles, and home remedies. (Note: home remedies, drinks, oils; later jams, preserves, pickles, gherkins, bottled drinks, and alcohols herbal waters, teas, dried flowers and herbs, cologne, toilet water, medicines, candles, and mixing of spices and the stillroom sometimes adjoins the housekeeper's room. beers, cakes, pastries, jams, chutneys, marmelades, and pickles "curing meats, dehydrating foods, drying, smoking, fermenting, pickling, canning, preserving sweets, baking bread, distilling vinegars, concocting savory sauces, and making cheese and other milk products. There is also a beverage chapter that covers brewing beer and making wine") It was also used to prepare afternoon tea; not just the beverages, but sandwiches and cakes. The good china for tea was therefore also kept there.

The still room was staffed by the housekeeper or cook, then later by the still room maid, who also served afternoon tea.

== As an annex to public commercial kitchens ==
If beverages were not dispensed from food service counters, then the design of commercial kitchens in hotels and restaurants traditionally included a still room where tea, coffee and other beverages were prepared and dispensed. These would be located immediately adjacent to hotel lounges. Central in the still room would be a gas or electric water boiler and separate coffee brewers. Crockery, tea pots and coffee pots would also be stored here.

== See also ==
- Leong, E (May 2013). "Collecting Knowledge for the Family: Recipes, Gender and Practical Knowledge in the Early Modern English Household". Centaurus; International Magazine of the History of Science and Medicine. 55 (2): 81–103. doi:10.1111/1600-0498.12019. PMC 3709121. PMID 23926360.
- Knowledge books, unpublished and published (most contemporary printings have long descriptive titles):
  - The Good Huswifes Jewell: Wherein is to be found most excellend and rare Deuises for conceites in Cookery, found out by the practise of Thomas Dawson: Wherevnto is adioyned sundry approued receits for many soueraine oyles, and the way to distill many precious waters, with diuers approued medicines for many diseases: Also certain approued points of husbandry, very necessary for all Husbandmen to know. (1585)
  - The English Huswife: Containing the Inward and Outward Virtues Which Ought to Be in a Complete Woman: as her Phisicke, Cookery, Banqueting-stuffe, Distillation, Perfumes, Wooll, Hemp, Flaxe, Dairies, Brewing, Baking, and all other things belonging to an Houshold (1615)
  - The closet of the eminently learned Sir Kenelm Digbie Kt. opened: Whereby is discovered several ways for making of metheglin, sider, cherry-wine &c. together with excellent directions for cookery: as also for preserving, conserving, candying, &c. (1669)
  - The Queen-like Closet, Or, Rich Cabinet: Stored with all manner of RARE RECEIPTS For Preserving, Candying and Cookery Very Pleasant and Beneficial to all Ingenious Persons of the FEMALE SEX (1670)
  - The Receipt Book of Lady Anne Blencowe, by Anne Blencowe, 1694
  - Mrs Mary Eales's Receipts (1718)
  - A Collection of Above Three Hundred Receipts in Cookery, Physick and Surgery; For the Use of all Good Wives, Tender Mothers, and Careful Nurses (1718)
  - The Compleat Housewife; or, Accomplish'd Gentlewoman's Companion: being a collection of upwards of six hundred of the most approved receipts, in cookery, pastry, confectionery, preserving, pickles, cakes, creams, jellies, made wines, cordials. With copper plates curiously engraven for the regular disposition or placing the various dishes or courses. And also bills of fare for every month of the year. To which is added, a collection of nearly two hundred family receipts of medicines; viz. drinks, syrups, salves, ointments, and many other things of sovereign and approved efficacy in most distempers, pains, aches, wounds, sores, etc. [...] never before made publick; fit either for private families, or such publick-spirited gentlewomen as would be beneficent to their poor neighbours. (1727)
  - The Art of Cookery Made Plain and Easy [...] (1747; includes preservation, distillation, beverages, precautions against pests, shipboard advice, and remedies; the title technically contains a table of contents, numbered in Roman numerals)
  - The Experienced English Housekeeper: for the use and ease of ladies, housekeepers, cooks, &c, wrote purely from practice [...] consisting of near nine hundred original receipts, most of which never appeared in print (1769)
  - The Lady's Complete Guide, or Cookery in all its Branches; Containing the most approved Receipts, confirmed by Observation and Practice, in every reputable English Book of Cookery now extant [...] the Compleat Brewer [...] the Family Physician [...] (1788)
  - Mrs. Beeton's Book of Household Management (1861)
- Places with stillrooms that are open to the public, often with reconstructed furnishings:
  - Charles Dickens Museum (a terraced house once occupied by the author)
  - Craigside House
  - Kentwell Hall (in the moated house)
  - Tatton Hall
  - Tredegar House
  - Uppark
  - Warwick Castle
