= Kitchen maid (domestic worker) =

Young housemaid or junior female domestic worker

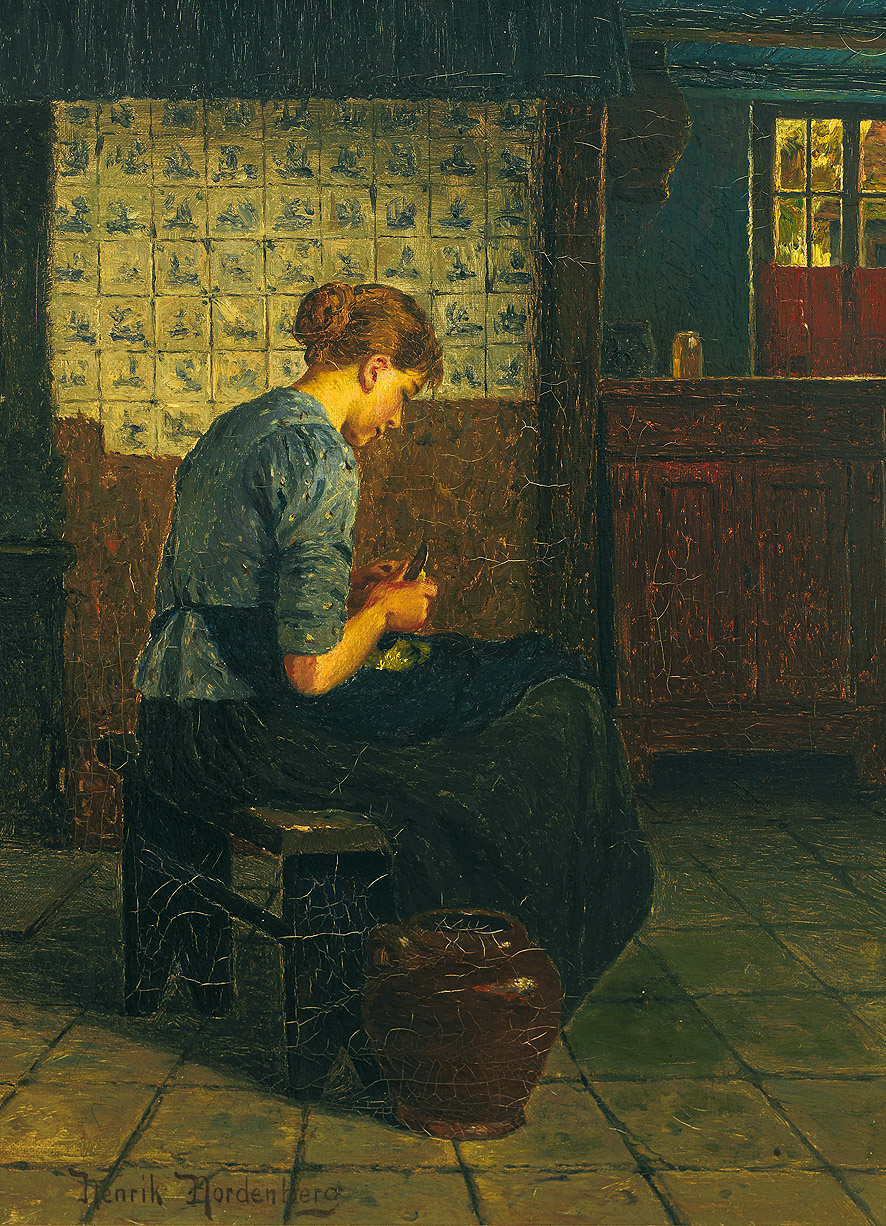
Dutch painting of a young kitchen maid. 19th century or early 20th century.

A kitchen maid or kitchen girl is a young housemaid, or other junior female domestic worker.

== Description ==
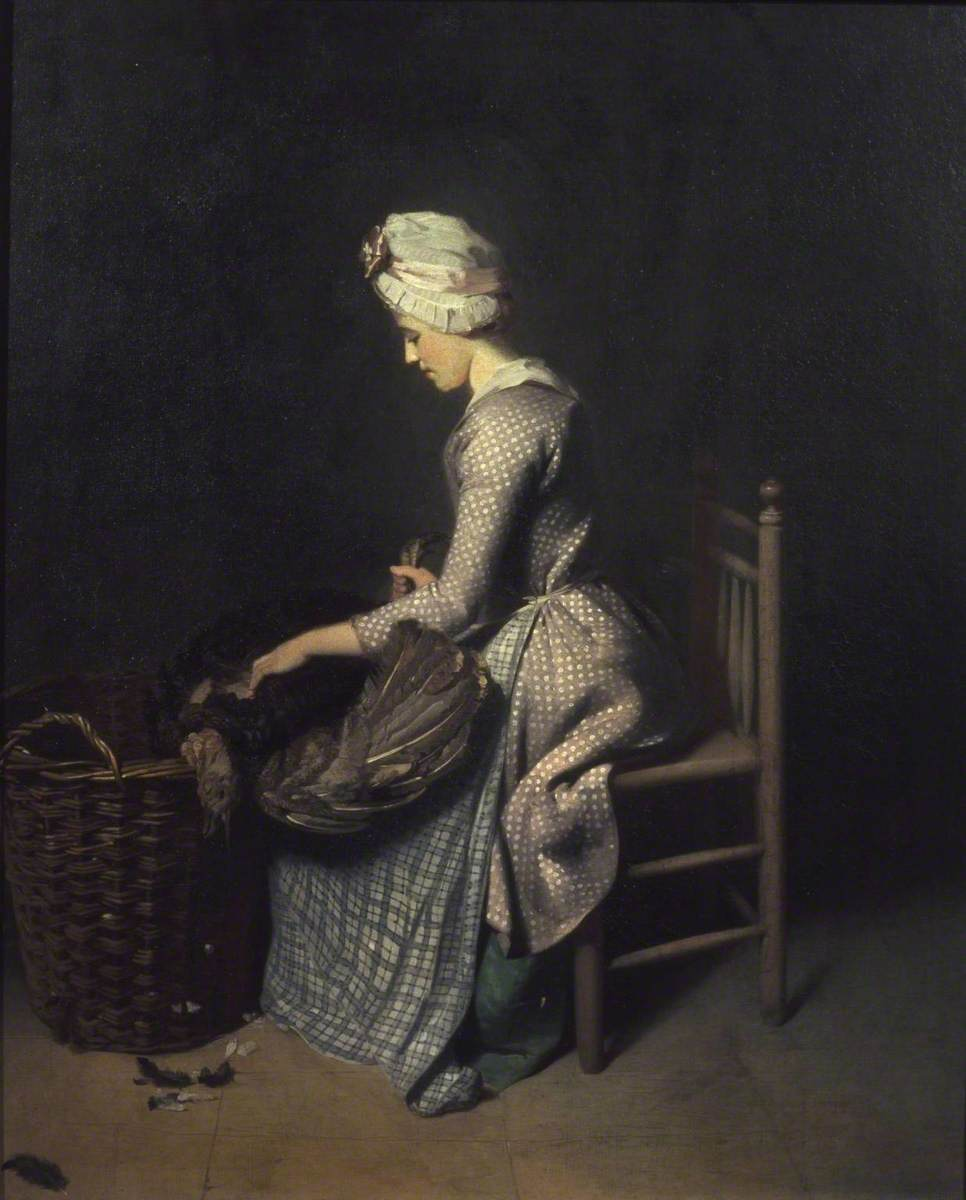
Plucking the Turkey by Henry Walton, 1776

In the hierarchy of a great house, the kitchen maid ranked below a cook and above a scullery maid. An experienced kitchen maid is an assistant cook; the position may be compared to that of a chef de partie in a professional restaurant kitchen.

An early meaning of "slut" was "kitchen maid or drudge" (c. 1450), a meaning retained as late as the 18th century.

In the 19th century a colloquial version was "kitching-maid".

== Known kitchen maids ==
- Margaret Powell worked as a kitchen girl at the age of 15.
