= Leslie Bartlett =

British butler and toastmaster

Leslie Bartlett (died 2004) was a butler, toastmaster and founder of the London School of British Butlers.

He also was an advisor to the 1995 film The Grotesque. The film had mediocre success but included singer Sting as part of the cast who was advised by Leslie on how to be a Butler.

In a career spanning over 60 years Leslie was closely affiliated with several members of the British Royal family, most notably the Queen Mother.

Later in life he dedicated his time into training young people that wished to follow the Butler profession, producing some of the best professionals in Private Service
