= Great house =

Large and stately residence

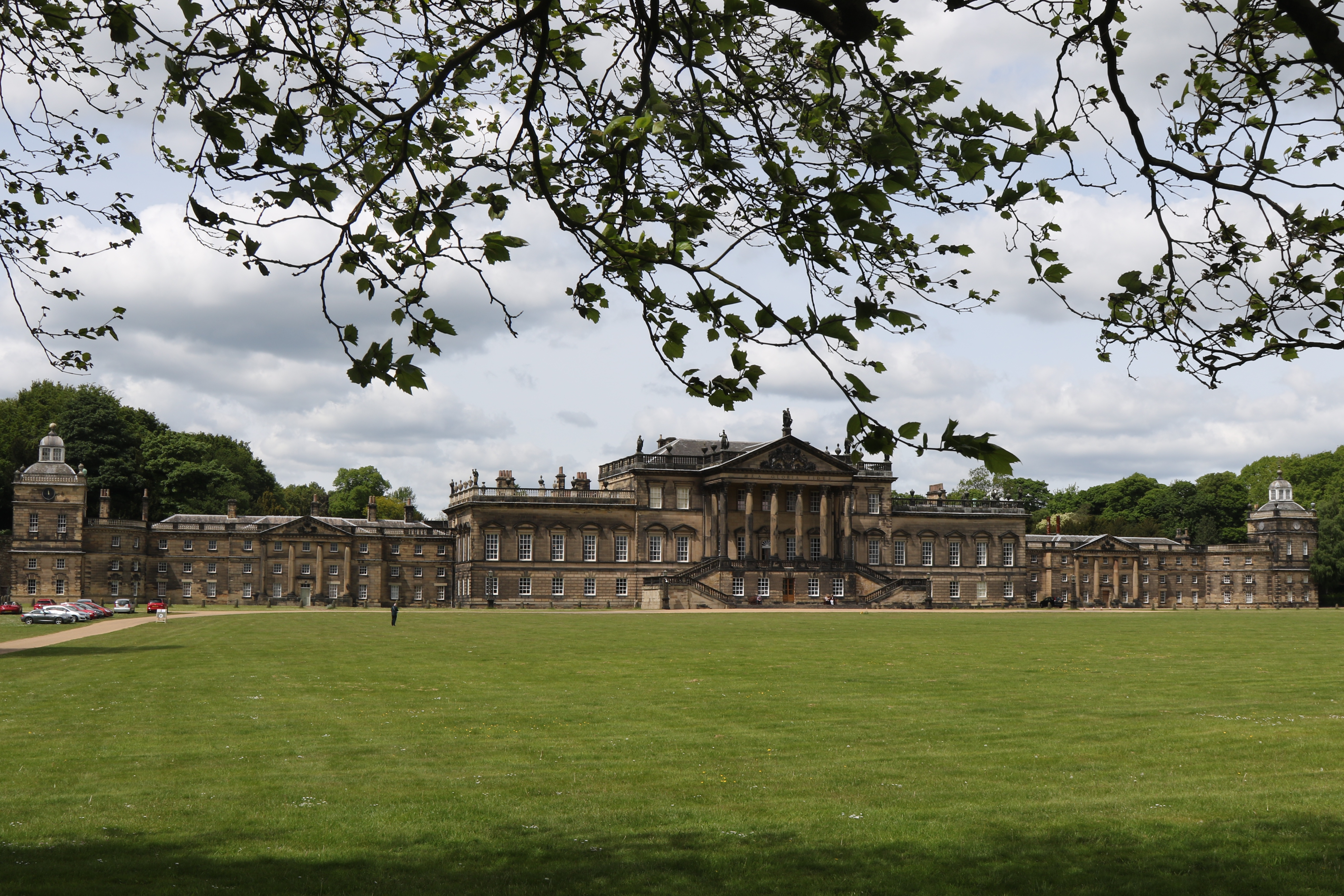
Wentworth Woodhouse in Yorkshire is the largest great house in the United Kingdom.

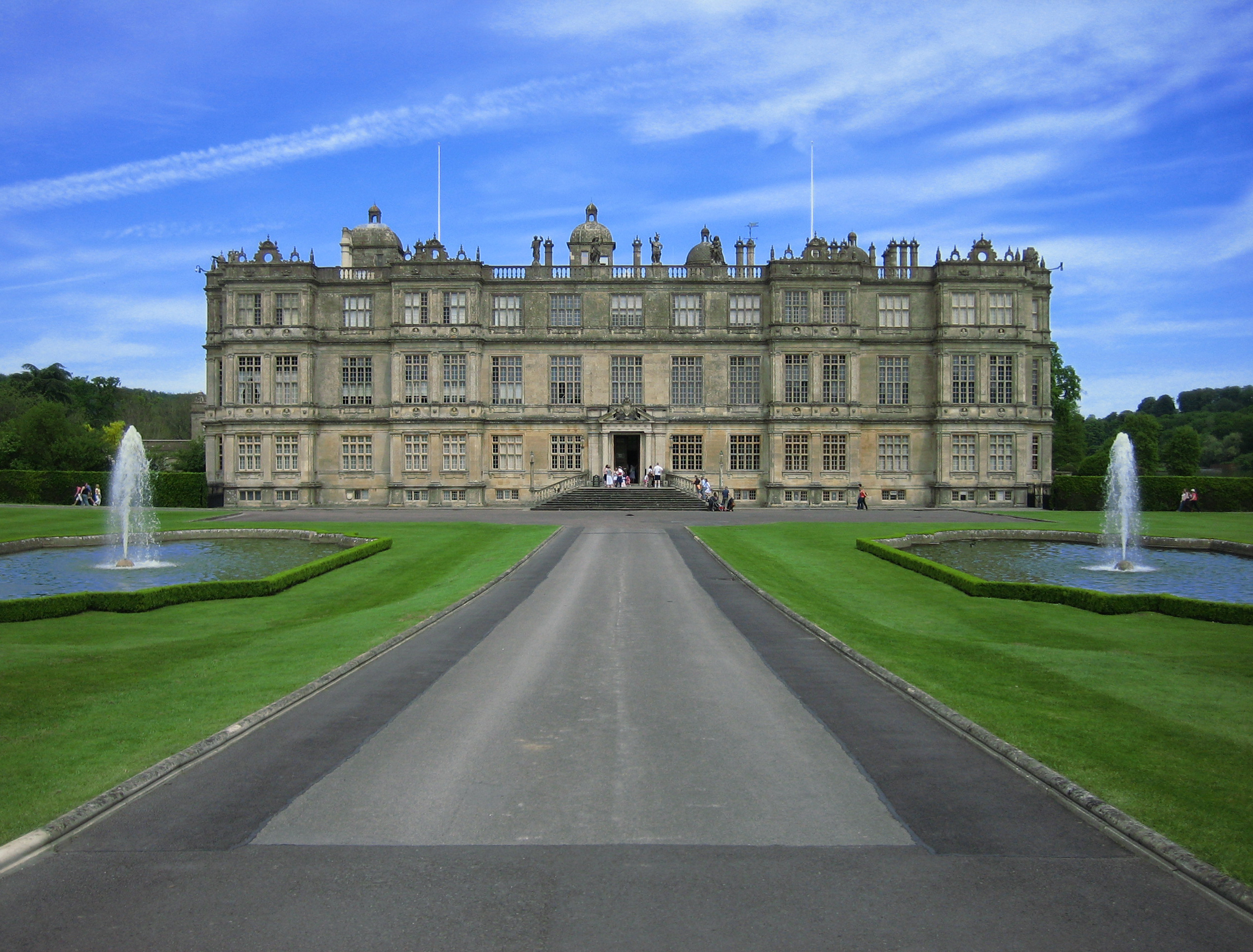
Longleat House in Wiltshire, the seat of the Marquesses of Bath

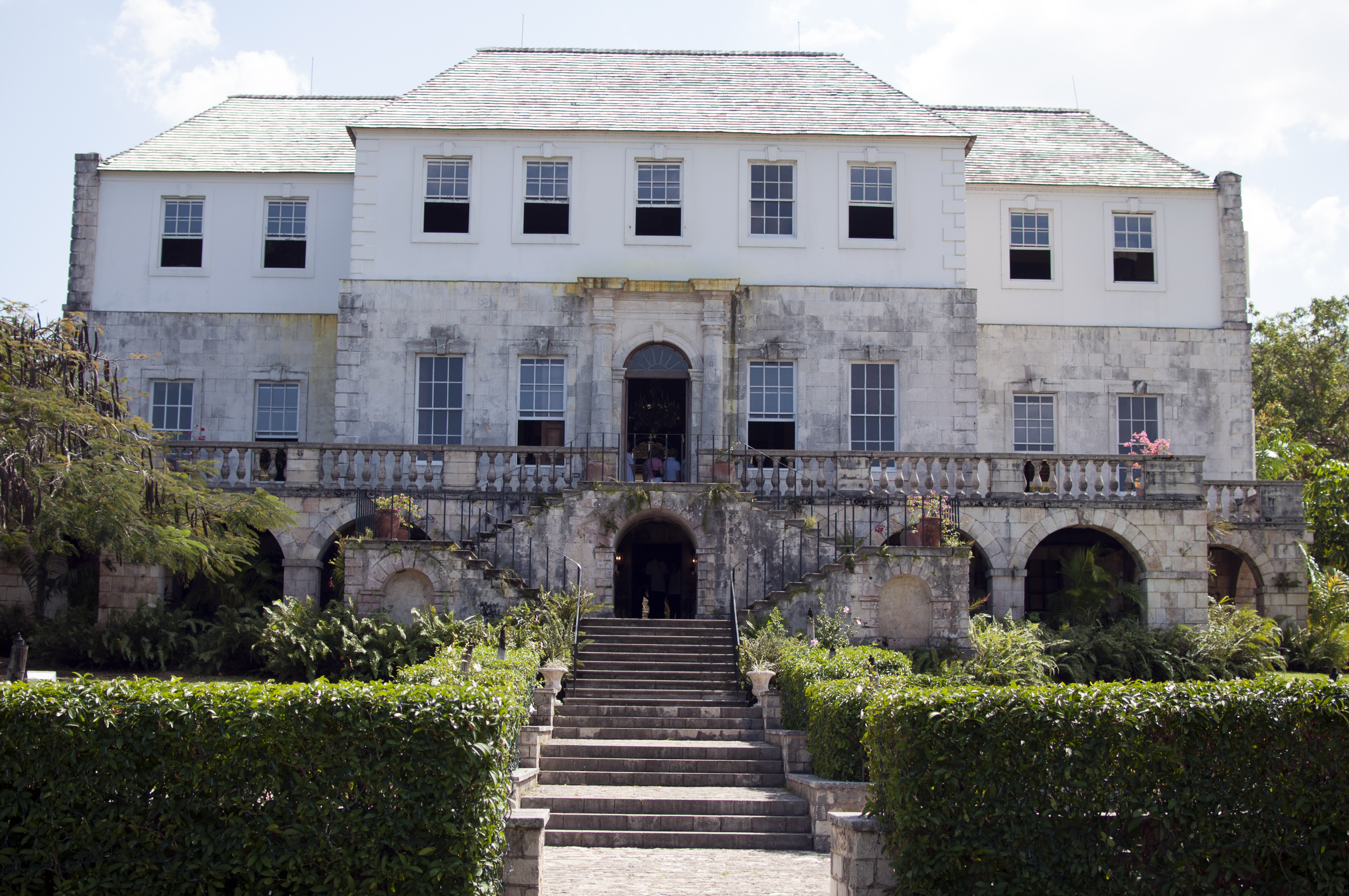
Rose Hall, a great house in Jamaica

A great house is a large house or mansion with luxurious appointments and great retinues of indoor and outdoor staff. The term is used mainly historically, especially of properties at the turn of the 20th century, i.e., the late Victorian or Edwardian era in the United Kingdom and the Gilded Age in the United States.

== Definition ==
There is no precise definition of "great house", and the understanding varies among countries. In England, while most villages would have had a manor house since time immemorial, originally home of the lord of the manor and sometimes referred to as "the big house", not all would have anything as lavish as a traditional English country house, one of the traditional markers of an established "county" family that derived at least a part of its income from landed property. Stately homes, even rarer and more expensive, were associated with the peerage, not the gentry.

Many mansions in Britain were demolished in the 20th century, since families that had previously split their time between their country house and their town house found the maintenance of both too expensive. Many properties are now open to the public as historic house museums, either run by their ancestral owners on a commercial basis, or having been given to English Heritage or similar organisations. Others operate as hotels and wedding venues. Some still serve as the family seat.

In Ireland, the term big house is usual for the houses of the Anglo-Irish ascendancy.

In the United States, great houses can be found on streets known informally as "millionaires' mile" (or "row") in certain cities.

In Jamaica, "great house" is the standard term for the house at the centre of plantation life, what in the United States is called a plantation house.

One commonality between countries is that the family occupying the great house were outnumbered, often greatly so, by their staff. There was often an elaborate hierarchy among domestic workers, familiar to many people today through television dramas such as Downton Abbey.

== Management ==
On large estates or in families with more than one residence, there may be a steward (or the modern equivalent, an estate manager) who oversees direction of the entire establishment. Today, it is not uncommon for a couple to split the duties of management between them.

The head of the household is not the butler, but the house manager. An estate manager administers more than one property, and usually has financial and managerial background.

Practices vary depending on the size of the household and the preference of the employers, but in general the staff is divided into departments run by the following staff:

Title	Description
Butler	The head of household staff in most homes; in charge of the pantry, wine cellar and dining room. In a small house the butler also valets for the master of the house. Male staff report to him. The butler is often engaged by the master of the house but usually reports to the lady of the house or sometimes to the housekeeper.
Cook	In charge of the kitchen and kitchen staff. Sometimes a chef is employed with several subordinate cooks. The cook usually reports directly to the lady of the house but sometimes to the housekeeper. If the cook is a woman, she is always addressed as "Mrs", regardless of her marital status.
Housekeeper	Responsible for the house and its appearance; in charge of all female servants, but can sometimes be the lead servant in a household. The housekeeper is always addressed as "Mrs", regardless of her marital status.

=== Support household staff ===
For the master of the house:

- Valet (Gentleman's gentleman)

For the lady of the house:

- Companion
- Lady's maid

For the children:

- Governess
- Nanny
- Tutor

For needs of the household:

- Chauffeur

=== Junior household staff ===
Sources:

- Footman
- Hall boy
- Useful man (also called houseman)
- Boot boy
- Maid (see Types of maid)
  - Between staff or Between maids (also called Hall girl, particularly in the US)
  - Chambermaid
  - Housemaid
  - Kitchen maid
  - Laundress
  - Nursemaid
  - Scullery maid
  - Still room maid
- Page
- Seamstress

== Grounds staff ==
A property manager may have charge of the maintenance and care of the grounds, landscaping, and outbuildings (pool, cabana, stables, greenhouse etc.) which is divided into departments run by the:

Title	Description
Head gardener	Responsible for the grounds around the house; in charge of any additional gardeners or seasonal men and women brought in at times of harvest or planting.
Stable master	Various titles used for the individual responsible for the keeping of animals, particularly those used for recreational pursuits such as horseback riding, fox hunting or dog fancy.
Gamekeeper	Various titles used for the individual responsible for the keeping of animals, particularly those used for recreational pursuits such as horseback riding, fox hunting or dog fancy.

=== Support grounds staff ===
- Gardeners
- Groundskeepers
- Stablehands
- Handyman

== Notable great houses ==
- Belcourt Castle
- Boldt Castle
- Biltmore Estate
- The Breakers
- Burghley House
- Castle Howard
- Cheshunt Great House
- Eaton Hall (Cheshire)
- The Elms
- Hatfield House
- Hearst Castle
- Hillwood
- Holkham Hall
- Hyde Park
- The Great House at Leyton
- James J. Hill House
- Lyndhurst
- Mansion House, London
- Marble House
- Moore Hall, County Mayo
- Moszna
- Rosecliff
- Rose Hall
- Syon House
- Westbury House
- White House
- Woburn Abbey

== Depictions of great houses ==
The complex hierarchy of a staff in a great house has been portrayed in several notable productions for film and television. Among these are:

- Backstairs at the White House
- Brideshead Revisited
- Downton Abbey, ITV television series filmed at Highclere Castle, a real-life great house
- The Edwardian Country House
- The Gilded Age
- Gosford Park
- Rebecca
- The Remains of the Day
- Upstairs, Downstairs
- You Rang, M'Lord?

== See also ==
- Real estate
- House society
- Master of the Horse, a courtier, i.e. a royal appointment, now only ceremonial
- Master of the Hounds, in charge of and financially responsible for a hunt, usually a foxhunt
