= Cook (domestic worker) =

Staff member responsible for food preparation

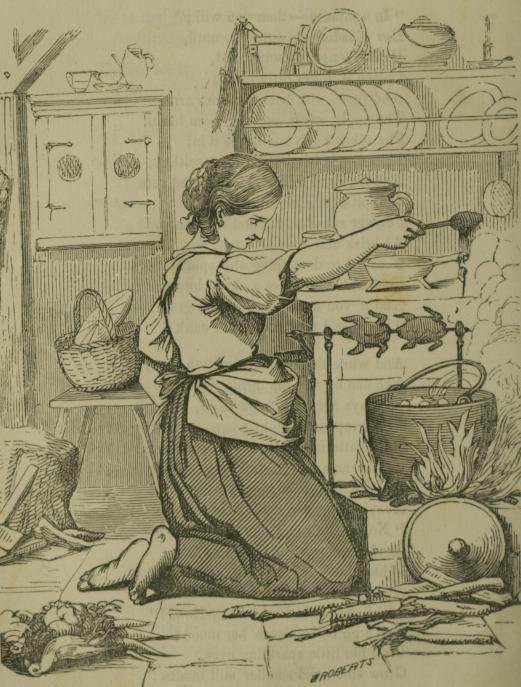
1855 Illustration of a "Disgruntled Cook"

A cook or private chef is a household staff member responsible for food preparation.

== Description ==
The term can refer to the head of kitchen staff in a great house or to the cook-housekeeper, a far less prestigious position involving more physical labour.

The cook in an English great house was traditionally female; today's residences may employ a head cook or chef who may be of either gender.

The cook is responsible for the preparation of daily meals and menus, as well as menus for parties and other special occasions. The cook is also responsible for the ordering of food, the maintenance of the kitchen and for keeping accounts with local merchants. The holder of the position reports directly to the lady of the house or sometimes to the housekeeper.

The cook supervises all kitchen staff. In large households, especially at a noble or royal court, this comprises an elaborate hierarchy, at the bottom of which come the kitchen boys (who, despite the name, were not always minors), in the largest households even further subdivided, perhaps the lowliest position being that of spitboy or turnbroach, who had to remain close to the hot fire to turn the roasting meat; there were six at Hampton Court palace in Henry VIII's reign.

There can be occasional staff conflicts over who supervises between staff, who may have duties that bring them into the realms of the cook, the housekeeper and the butler.

In the hierarchy of domestic service, a cook usually earned her position through apprenticeship, perhaps beginning in service as a kitchen maid.

Today's cooks are likely to have spent years in domestic service in different households, or have gone to cooking school. Few modern families can afford retinues of domestic workers, so the cook is often expected to be a cook-housekeeper and responsible for cleaning and nannying as well.

== Known private cooks ==
- Marie-Antoine Carême, for Charles Maurice de Talleyrand-Périgord, Tsar Alexander I of Russia and George the Prince Regent
- Charles Elmé Francatelli, for Queen Victoria
- Avis Crocombe, for Charles Neville, 5th Baron Braybrooke at Audley End House; noted for a notebook of Victorian-era recipes that inspired a web series operated by English Heritage
- Margaret Powell, who began as a kitchen girl at the age of 15, later advanced to become a private cook.
- Michel Roux, for Philippe de Rothschild

== In popular culture ==
- Aunt Chloe, described as the "first cook in the neighborhood", in Uncle Tom's Cabin
- Aunt Jemima, a fictional character in advertising
- Mrs. Patmore (played by Lesley Nicol), the Earl of Grantham's cook at Downton Abbey in the acclaimed ITV/PBS television series Downton Abbey (2010-2015)
- Blath of Kildare, patron saint of cooks

== See also ==
- Cook (profession)
  - Domestic worker
- Personal chef
