= Hall boy =

Type of British domestic worker

The hall boy or hallboy was a young male domestic worker on the staff of a great house, usually a young teenager. The name derives from the fact that the hall boy usually slept in the servants' hall.

Like his female counterpart, the scullery maid, the hall boy would have been expected to work up to 16 hours per day, seven days per week. His duties were often among the most disagreeable in the house, such as emptying chamber pots for the higher-ranking servants. In the absence of a boot boy, he also cleaned the boots not just of the family members but also those of the butler and those of the visitors. The hall boy also waited on more senior servants when they took their meals in the servants hall. He slept on a fold-down bed in the hallway connecting the servants' quarters.

The hall boy was the lowest-ranked male servant, but he could rise to a higher position in the household, eventually becoming a valet or butler. Arthur Inch, a former butler who acted as a technical consultant for the film Gosford Park and the television series Downton Abbey, stated in an interview that he began his life in service as a hall boy at the age of 15.

== See also ==
- Domestic worker
- Cabin boy
- The Edwardian Country House – A British enactment show produced by Channel 4 in 2002, including a hall boy as one of the re-enactors
- List of obsolete occupations
