= Boot boy =

English household servant

A boot boy, often simply boots, was an English household servant. Usually a boy or young teenager, the boots was the lowest-ranking male servant; his main job was to clean, polish and care for the household members' boots and shoes, although he may have done other odd jobs as well, particularly in smaller houses where he may have also performed the duties of the hallboy.

One contemporary use of the term appears in Arthur Conan Doyle's 1887 Sherlock Holmes novel A Study in Scarlet: “[Inspector Lestrade] reached Halliday's Private Hotel, in Little George Street... The Boots volunteered to show [him] the room.” (Chapter VII)

The term is used in association football, to refer to apprentices looking after the football boots of senior professionals.

== See also ==
- Child labour
- Ball boy
- Fagging
- Page (servant)
