= Servants' hall =

Domestic worker's dining hall

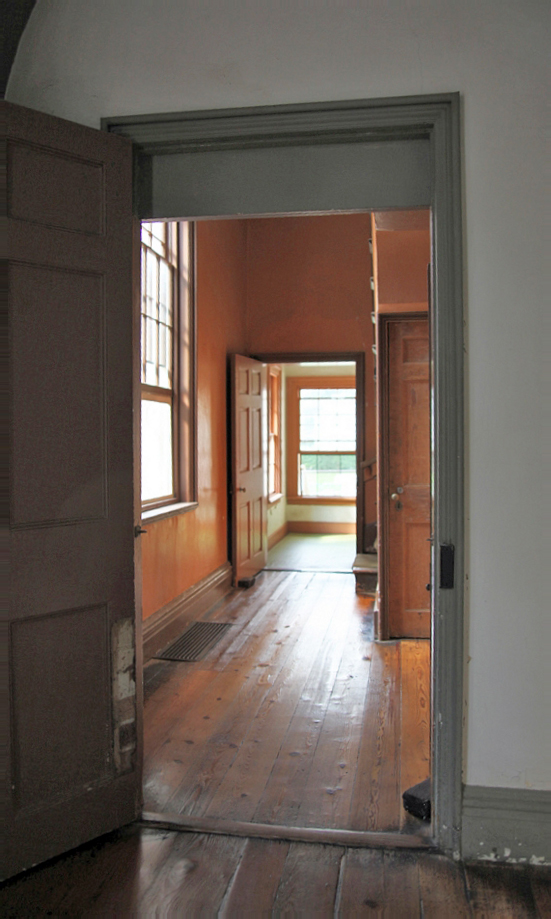
View from family dining room into servant's hall. Arlington House.

The servants' hall is a common room for domestic workers in a great house, typically referring to the servants' dining room.

If there is no separate sitting room, the servants' hall doubles as the place servants may spend their leisure hours and serves as both sitting room and dining room.

== Background ==
Meals in the servants' hall were sometimes very formal affairs, depending on the size and formality of the household. At dinner in a formal house, the butler and housekeeper presided over the table much as the master and lady of the house did 'above stairs' (i.e., in the rooms occupied by the employer).

In Victorian England, the strict rules of precedence were mirrored by the domestic staff in grand or formal homes in the seating arrangements of the Servants' Hall. A senior servant such as the lady's maid took the place of honour but would have to "go lower" (i.e. take a place further down the table) if the employer of a visiting servant outranked the mistress of the house.

== See also ==
- Servants' quarters
