= Footman =

Male domestic worker

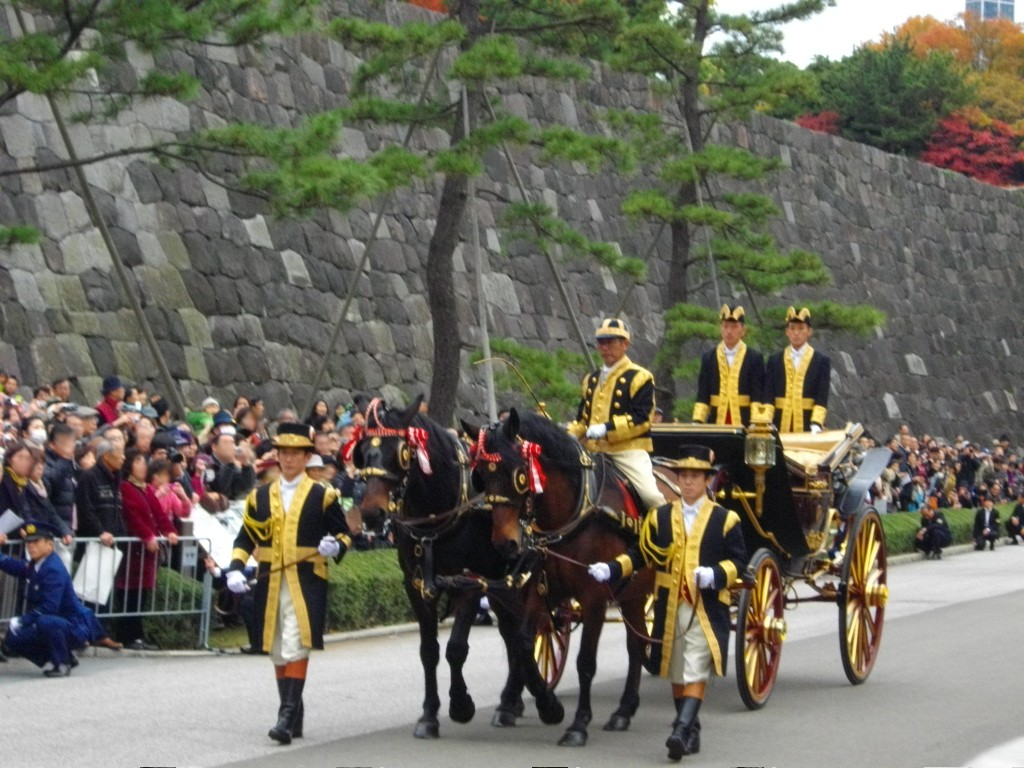
Four footmen, two standing on the rear platform of the carriage and two walking alongside the horses. The fifth person riding is a postilion. (Japan 2009)

A footman is a male domestic worker employed mainly to wait at table or attend a coach or carriage, usually dressed in livery. One of the man-servant domestic positions, the footman ranks above a hall boy and page, and below a valet and butler, although a footman might have duties which overlap or replace those other positions. Footmen were also employed to accompany carriages and coaches, either riding seated beside the coachman or on a seat or standing board at the rear of the carriage. They also helped passengers in and out of carriages.

== Etymology ==
Originally in the 14th century a footman denoted a soldier or any pedestrian, later it indicated a foot servant. A running footman delivered messages. He might run beside or behind the carriages of aristocrats, running alongside the coach to make sure it was not overturned by such obstacles as ditches or tree roots. A footman might also run ahead to the destination to prepare for his lord's arrival.

== Roles ==
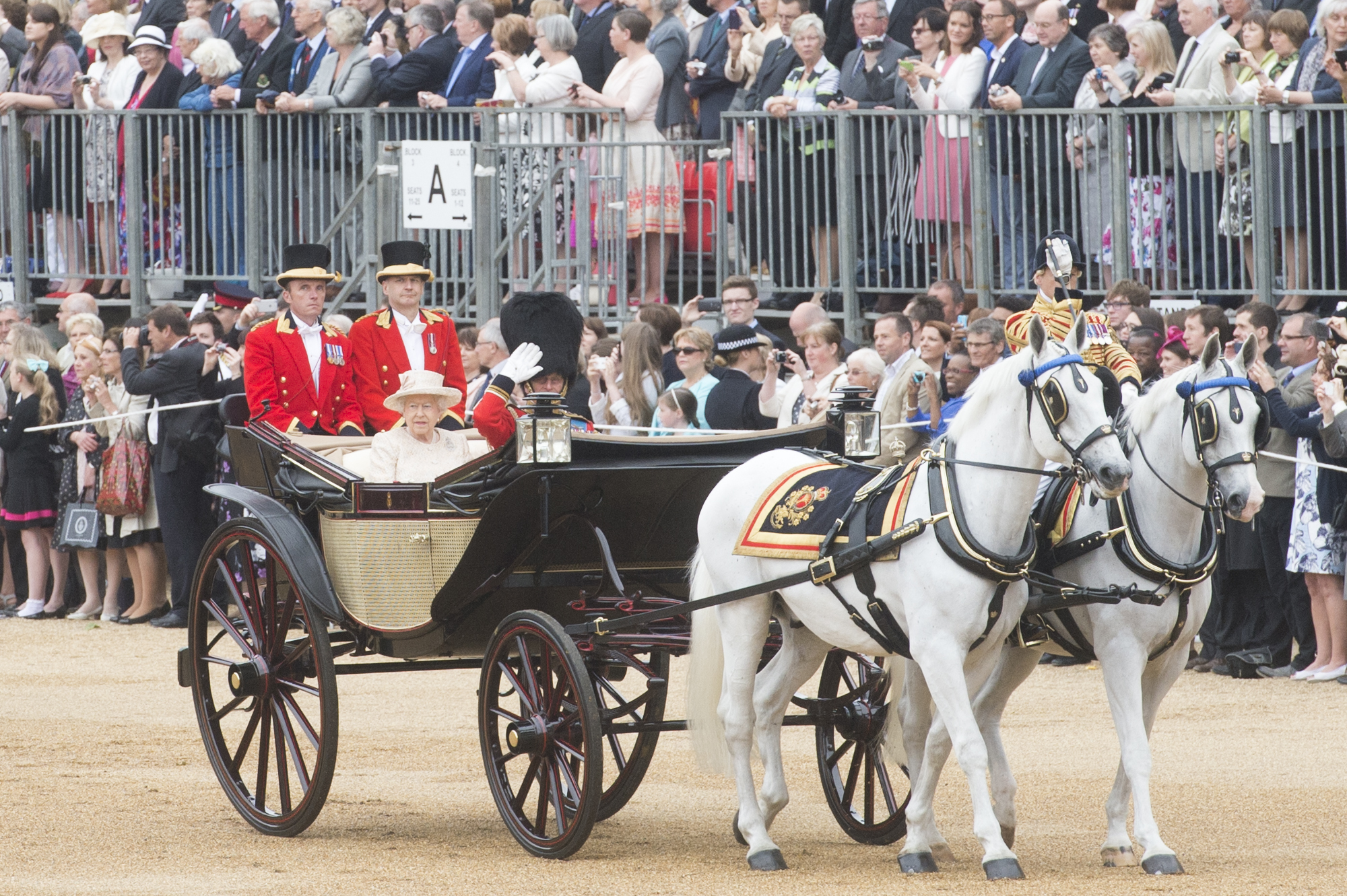
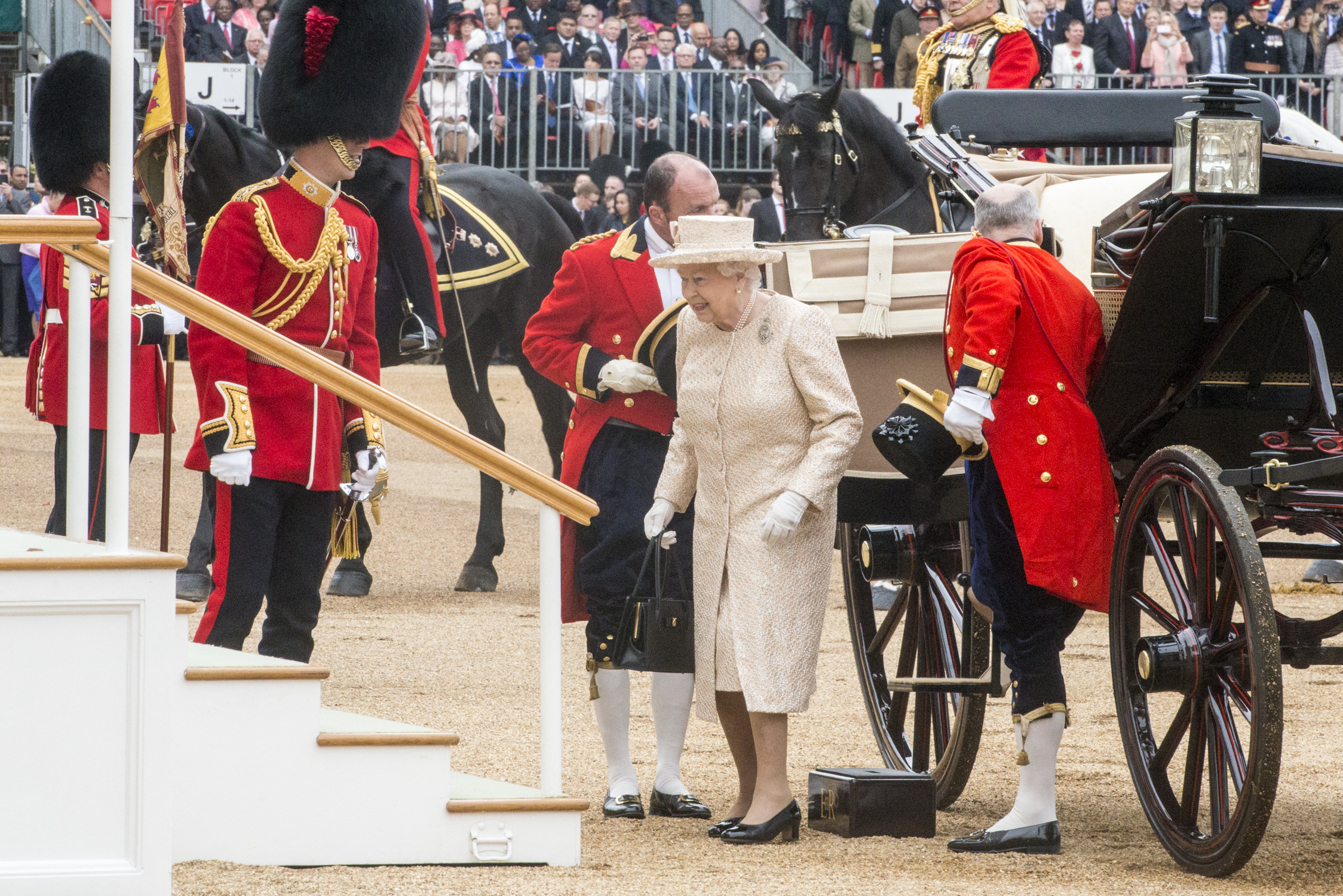
Two footmen seated at the rear of the carriage assist passengers when the carriage is not in motion. (UK 2015)

The name was applied to a household servant who waited at table and attended, rode on his employer's coach or carriage in case of untoward incidents. In many cases, a footman was expected to serve as an armed bodyguard. Many were skilled with pistols to defend their employer's coach against highwaymen.

The first footman was the designation given to the highest-ranking servant of this class in a given household. The first footman would serve as deputy butler and act as butler in the latter's absence, although some larger houses also had an under-butler above the first footman.

In a larger household, various footmen might be assigned specific duties (for which there might be a traditional sequence), such as the silver specialist. Usually the footmen performed a range of duties which included serving meals, opening and closing doors, carrying heavy items, or moving furniture for the housemaid to clean behind. The footmen might also double as valets, especially for visiting guests.

== Servants ==
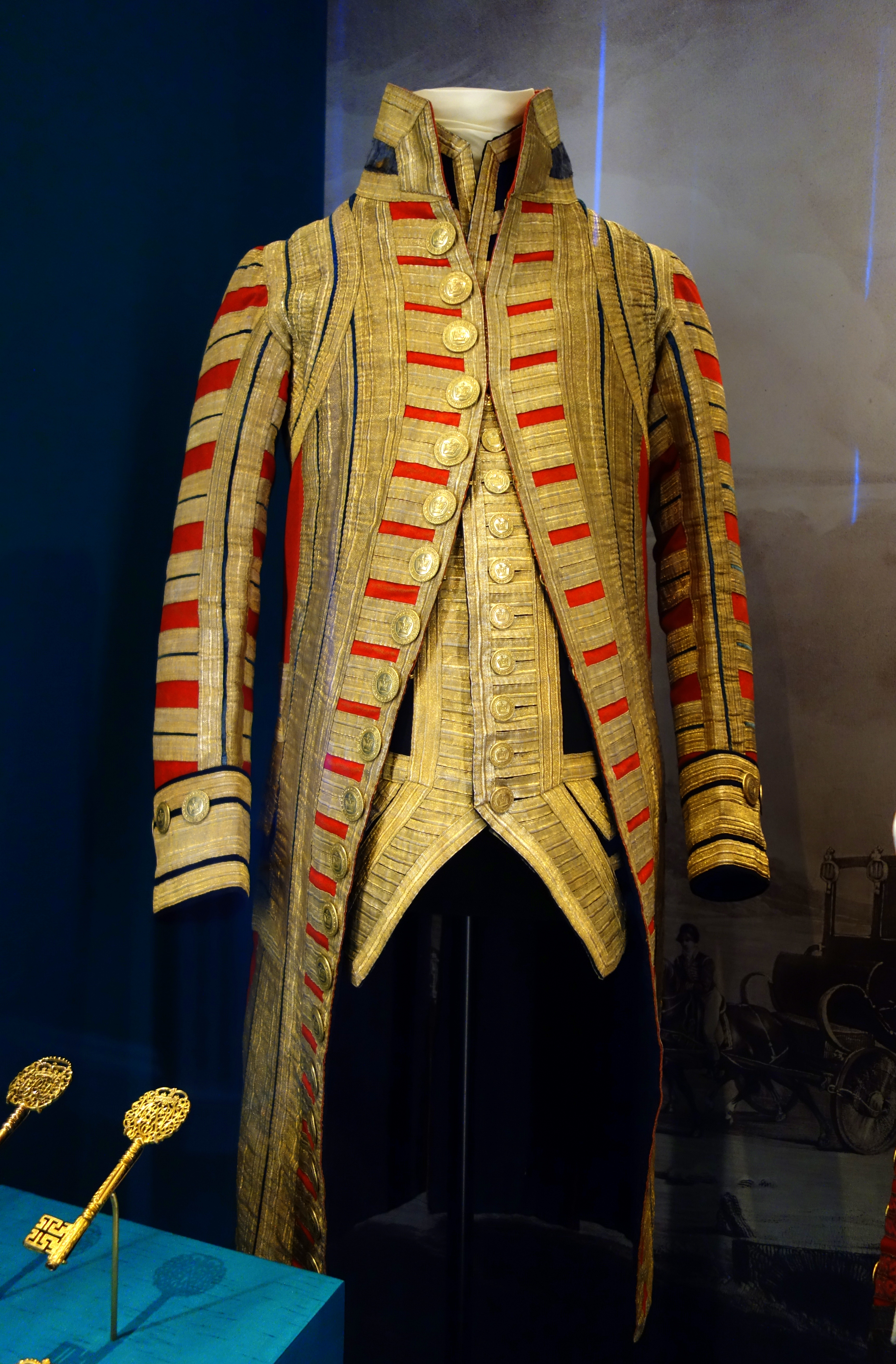
1817 footman or groom's livery, Kensington Palace

Male servants were paid more than female servants and footmen were something of a luxury and therefore a status symbol even among the servant-employing classes. They performed a less-essential role than the cook, maid or even butler, and were employed only by the grandest households. Since a footman was for show as much as for work, his good looks were highly prized, including a tall stature and well-turned legs, shown off by the traditional footman's dress of stockings below knee breeches. Footmen were expected to be unmarried and tended to be relatively young; they might, however, progress to other posts, notably that of butler. One 19th-century footman, William Tayler, kept a diary which has been published. He was, in fact, married, but he kept it secret from his employers and visited his family only on his days off.

Once a common position in great houses, the footman became much rarer after World War I as fewer households could afford large retinues. The role is now virtually a historic one, although servants with this designation are still employed in the British Royal Household, wearing a distinctive scarlet livery on state occasions.

== Famous fictional footmen ==
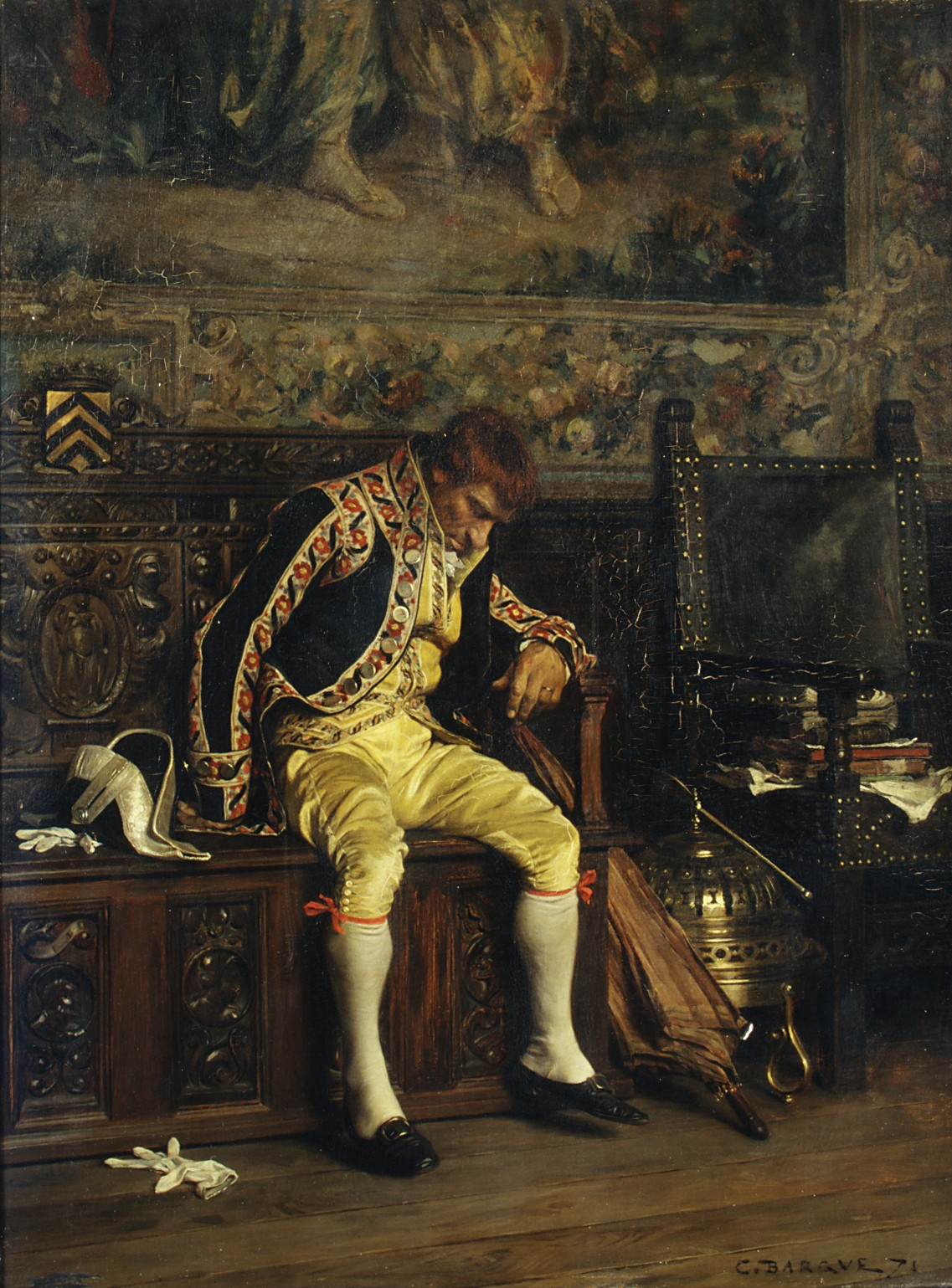
A Footman Sleeping, 1871 by French painter Charles Bargue

- In Lewis Carroll's novel Alice's Adventures in Wonderland, the Queen of Hearts' Fish Footman delivers an invitation to the Duchess's Frog Footman.
- George (Richard E. Grant), first footman in service to Sir William McCordle (Michael Gambon), in the 2001 film Gosford Park, directed by Robert Altman.
- Thomas Barrow (Rob James-Collier) and William Mason (Thomas Howes) serve as first and second footman, respectively, to Robert Crawley, Earl of Grantham (Hugh Bonneville) in the Julian Fellowes period drama Downton Abbey.

== See also ==
- The Only Running Footman – Pub in London
- List of obsolete occupations
