= Butler =

Usually male domestic worker in charge of all the household staff

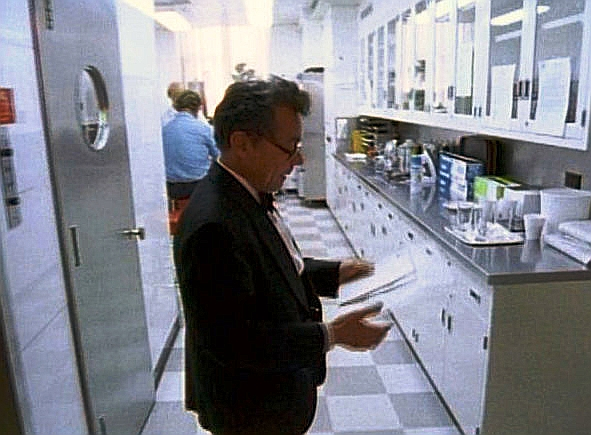
A butler in the White House Butler's Pantry.

A butler is a person who works in a house serving and is a domestic worker in a large household. In great houses, the household is sometimes divided into departments, with the butler in charge of the dining room, wine cellar, and pantry. Some also have charge of the entire parlour floor and housekeepers caring for the entire house and its appearance. A butler is usually male and in charge of male servants, while a housekeeper is usually female and in charge of female servants. Traditionally, male servants (such as footmen) were better paid and of higher status than female servants. The butler, as the senior male servant, has the highest servant status. He can also sometimes function as a chauffeur.

In older houses where the butler is the most senior worker, titles such as majordomo, butler administrator, house manager, manservant, staff manager, chief of staff, staff captain, estate manager, and head of household staff are sometimes given. The precise duties of the employee will vary to some extent in line with the title given but, perhaps more importantly, in line with the requirements of the individual employer. In the grandest homes or when the employer owns more than one residence, there is sometimes an estate manager of higher rank than the butler. The butler can also be assisted by a head footman or footboy called the under-butler.

== Background ==
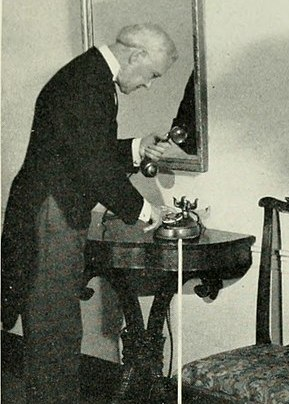
Butler c. 1922

The word butler comes from Anglo-Norman buteler, a variant form of Old Norman *butelier, corresponding to Old French botellier 'officer in charge of the king's wine bottles', derived from boteille 'bottle' (Modern French bouteille), itself from Gallo-Romance BUTICULA 'bottle'. For centuries, the butler has been the attendant entrusted with the care and serving of wine and other bottled beverages, which in ancient times might have represented a considerable portion of the household's assets and led to the position becoming chief steward of a household.

In Britain, the butler was originally a middle-ranking member of the staff of a grand household. In the 17th and 18th centuries, the butler gradually became the senior, usually male, member of a household's staff in the very grandest households. However, there was sometimes a steward who ran the outside estate and financial affairs, rather than just the household, and who was senior to the butler in social status into the 19th century. Butlers used always to be attired in a special uniform, distinct from the livery of junior servants, but today a butler is more likely to wear a business suit or business casual clothing and appear in uniform only on special occasions.

A silverman or silver butler has expertise and professional knowledge of the management, secure storage, use and cleaning of all silverware, associated tableware and other paraphernalia for use at military and other special functions.

== Origin and history ==
A slave in charge of wine in ancient Rome.

The modern role of the butler has evolved from earlier roles that were generally concerned with the care and serving of alcoholic beverages.

=== Ancient through medieval eras ===
From ancient through medieval times, alcoholic beverages were chiefly stored first in earthenware vessels, then later in wooden barrels, rather than in glass bottles; these containers would have been an important part of a household's possessions. The care of these assets was therefore generally reserved for trusted slaves, although the job could also go to free persons because of heredity-based class lines or the inheritance of trades.

The biblical book of Genesis contains a reference to a role precursive to modern butlers. The early Hebrew Joseph interpreted a dream of Pharaoh's שקה (shaqah) (literally "to give to drink"), which is most often translated into English as "chief butler" or "chief cup-bearer".

In ancient Greece and Rome, it was nearly always slaves who were charged with the care and service of wine, while during the Medieval Era the pincerna filled the role within the noble court. The English word "butler" itself comes from the Middle English word bo(u)teler (and several other forms), from Anglo-Norman buteler, itself from Old Norman butelier, corresponding to Old French botellier ("bottle bearer"), Modern French bouteiller, and before that from Medieval Latin butticula. The modern English "butler" thus relates both to bottles and casks.

A pincerna depicted in service to a noble court during the Medieval Era.

Eventually the European butler emerged as a middle-ranking member of the servants of a great house, in charge of the buttery (originally a storeroom for "butts" of liquor, although the term later came to mean a general storeroom or pantry).

While this is so for household butlers, those with the same title but in service to the Crown enjoyed a position of administrative power and were only minimally involved with various stores. The Chief Butler of England was a hereditary ceremonial role that existed in both England and Ireland from the medieval period. In England, it formed part of a system known as Grand Sergeanty, whereby landholders provided specific services to the Crown.

In Ireland, the office was granted to Theobald Walter, 1st Chief Butler of Ireland in 1177 by Prince John, then Lord of Ireland. The importance of the role was such that Theobald Walter's descendants adopted "Butler" as their surname. They subsequently became the foundation of the powerful Butler dynasty, whose members played a central role in Irish political and social life for centuries.

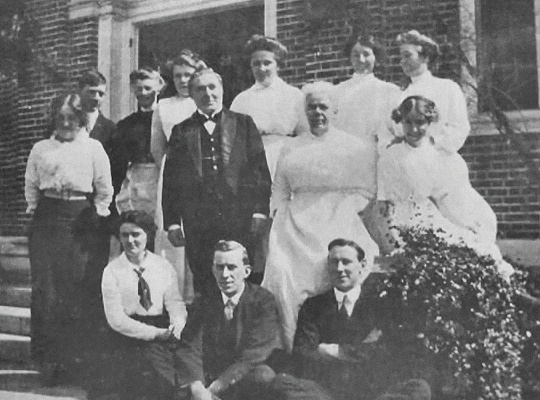
In a large house, the butler (centre-left) is traditionally head over a full array of household servants. This is the servant staff at the Stonehouse Hill of Massachusetts, US the estate of Frederick Lothrop Ames, 1914.

=== Elizabethan through Victorian eras ===
The steward of the Elizabethan era was more akin to the butler that later emerged. Gradually, throughout the 19th century and particularly the Victorian era, as the number of butlers and other domestic servants greatly increased in various countries, the butler became a senior male servant of a household's staff. By this time he was in charge of the more modern wine cellar, the "buttery" or pantry (from French pain from Latin panis, bread) as it came to be called, which supplied bread, butter, cheese, and other basic provisions, and the ewery, which contained napkins and basins for washing and shaving. In the very grandest households there was sometimes an Estate Steward or other senior steward who oversaw the butler and his duties. Mrs Beeton's Book of Household Management, a manual published in Britain in 1861, reported:

The number of the male domestics in a family varies according to the wealth and position of the master, from the owner of the ducal mansion, with a retinue of attendants, at the head of which is the chamberlain and house-steward, to the occupier of the humbler house, where a single footman, or even the odd man-of-all-work, is the only male retainer. The majority of gentlemen's establishments probably comprise a servant out of livery, or butler, a footman, and coachman, or coachman and groom, where the horses exceed two or three.

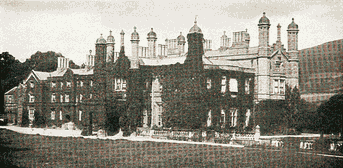
Glanusk Park in Powys, UK, in 1891. The residence had 17 servants in residence. The largest stately houses could have 40 or more.

Butlers were head of a strict service hierarchy and therein held a position of power and respect. They were more managerial than "hands on"—more so than serving, they officiated in service. For example, although the butler was at the door to greet and announce the arrival of a formal guest, the door was actually opened by a footman, who would receive the guest's hat and coat. Even though the butler helped his employer into his coat, this had been handed to him by a footman. However, even the highest-ranking butler would "pitch in" when necessary, such as during a staff shortage, to ensure that the household ran smoothly, although some evidence suggests this was so even during normal times.

The household itself was generally divided into areas of responsibility. The butler was in charge of the dining room, the wine cellar, pantry, and sometimes the entire main floor. Directly under the butler was the first footman (or head footman), although there could also be a deputy butler or under-butler who would fill in as butler during the butler's illness or absence. The footman‒there were frequently numerous young men in the role within a household‒ performed a range of duties including serving meals, attending doors, carrying or moving heavy items, and they often doubled as valets. Valets themselves performed a variety of personal duties for their employer. Butlers engaged and directed all these junior staff and each reported directly to him. The housekeeper was in charge of the house as a whole and its appearance. In a household without an official head housekeeper, female servants and kitchen staff were also directly under the butler's management, while in smaller households, the butler usually doubled as valet. Employers and their children and guests addressed the butler (and under-butler, if there was one) by last name alone; fellow servants, retainers, and tradespersons as "Mr. [Surname]".

Butlers were typically hired by the master of the house but usually reported to its lady. Beeton in her manual suggested a GBP 25–50 (US$2,675‒5,350) per-year salary for butlers; room and board and livery clothing were additional benefits, and tipping known as vails, were common. The few butlers who were married had to make separate housing arrangements for their families, as did all other servants within the hierarchy.

=== In the early United States ===
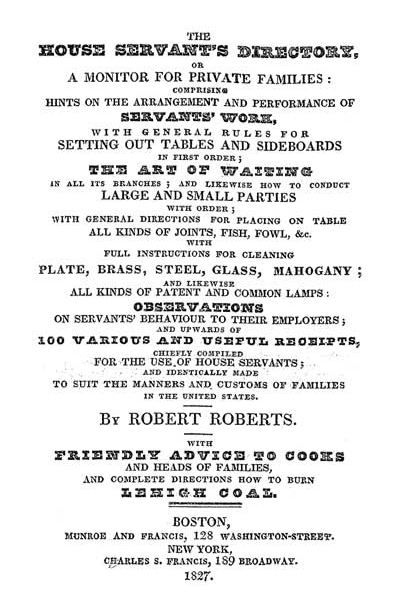
Robert Roberts's The House Servant's Directory, 1827.

From the beginning of slavery in the United States, in the early 17th century, African Americans were put to task as domestic servants. Some eventually became butlers. Gary Puckrein, a social historian, argues that those used in particularly affluent homes authentically internalised the sorts of "refined" norms and personal attributes that would reflect highly upon the social stature of their masters or mistresses. One of the first books written and published through a commercial U.S. publisher by an African American was by a butler named Robert Roberts. The book, The House Servant's Directory, first published in 1827, is essentially a manual for butlers and waiters, and is called by Puckrein "the most remarkable book by an African American in antebellum United States". The book generated such interest that a second edition was published in 1828, and a third in 1843.

European indentured servants formed a corps of domestic workers from which butlers were eventually drawn. Although not the victims of institutionalised slavery, many of them had not volunteered for domestic service, but were forced into it by indebtedness or coercion. As with African American slaves, they could rise in domestic service, and their happiness or misery depended greatly on the disposition of their masters.

=== The modern butler ===
Beginning around the early 1920s (following World War I), employment in domestic service occupations began a sharp overall decline in western European countries, and even more markedly in the United States. Even so, there were still around 30,000 butlers employed in Britain by World War II. As few as one hundred were estimated to remain by the mid-1980s. Social historian Barry Higman argues that a high number of domestic workers within a society correlates with a high level of socio-economic inequality. Conversely, as a society undergoes levelling among its social classes, the number employed in domestic service declines.

Following varied shifts and changes accompanying accelerated globalisation beginning in the late 1980s, overall global demand for butlers since the turn of the millennium has risen dramatically. According to Charles MacPherson, President of Charles MacPherson Associates and owner of The Charles MacPherson Academy for Butlers and Household Managers, the proximate cause is that the number of millionaires and billionaires has increased in recent years, and such people are finding that they desire assistance in managing their households. MacPherson emphasises that the number of wealthy people in China has increased particularly, creating in that country a high demand for professional butlers who have been trained in the European butlering tradition. There is also increasing demand for such butlers in India, the petroleum-rich Middle East and other Asian countries.

Higman additionally argues that the inequality/equality levels of societies are a major determinant of the nature of the domestic servant/employer relationship. As the 21st century approached, many butlers began carrying out an increasing number of duties formerly reserved for more junior household servants. Butlers today may be called upon to do whatever household and personal duties their employers deem fitting, in the goal of freeing their employers to carry out their own personal and professional affairs. Professional butler and author Steven M. Ferry states that the image of tray-wielding butlers who specialise in serving tables and decanting wine is now anachronistic, and that employers may well be more interested in a butler who is capable of managing a full array of household affairs‒from providing the traditional dinner service, to acting as valet, to managing high-tech systems and multiple homes with complexes of staff. While in truly grand houses the modern butler may still function exclusively as a top-ranked household affairs manager, in lesser homes, such as those of dual-income middle-class professionals, they perform a full array of household and personal assistant duties, including mundane housekeeping. Butlers today may also be situated within corporate settings, embassies, cruise ships, yachts, or within their own small "Rent-a-Butler" business or similar agency.

Along with these changes of scope and context, butlering attire has changed. Whereas butlers have traditionally worn a special uniform that separated them from junior servants, and although this is still often the case, butlers today may wear more casual clothing geared for climate, while exchanging it for formal business attire only upon special service occasions. There are cultural distinctions, as well. In the United States, butlers may frequently don a polo shirt and slacks, while in Bali they typically wear sarongs.

In 2007, the number of butlers in Britain had risen to an estimated 5,000. That number rose to 10,000 by 2014, consistent with increased worldwide demand.

== Training ==
Butlers traditionally learned their position while progressing their way up the service ladder. For example, in the documentary The Authenticity of Gosford Park, retired butler Arthur Inch (born 1915) describes starting as a hall boy. While this is still often the case, numerous private butlering schools exist today. Additionally, major up-market hotels such as the Ritz-Carlton offer traditional butler training, while some hotels have trained a sort of pseudo-butler for service in defined areas such as "technology butlers", who fix guests' computers and other electronic devices, and "bath butlers" who draw custom baths.

== Gender and butlering ==
Butlers have traditionally been male, and this remains the norm. Probably the first mention of a female butler is in the 1892 book Interludes being Two Essays, a Story, and Some Verses by Horace Smith. In it Smith quotes the noted writer and Anglican clergyman Sydney Smith, who between 1809 and 1829 struggled to make ends meet in a poorly paid assignment to a rural parish in Yorkshire:

I turned schoolmaster to educate my son, as I could not afford to send him to school. Mrs. Sydney turned schoolmistress to educate my girls as I could not afford a governess. I turned farmer as I could not let my land. A man servant was too expensive, so I caught up a little garden girl, made like a milestone, christened her Bunch, put a napkin in her hand, and made her my butler. The girls taught her to read, Mrs. Sydney to wait, and I undertook her morals. Bunch became the best butler in the country.

Today, female butlers are sometimes preferred, especially for work within West Asian and Southeast Asian families where there may be religious objections for men to work closely with women in a household. Western female celebrities may also prefer a female butler, as may households where the wife is driving the decision to hire a butler. Despite these trends, the Ivor Spencer School asserts that female butlers are not easily placed, on the whole.

In ancient times, the roles precursive to butlering were reserved for chattel or those confined within heredity-based class structures. With the advent of the medieval era, butlering became an opportunity for social advancement‒even more so during Victorian times. Although still based upon various antecedent roles as manifested during different eras, butlering today has frequently taken over many of the roles formerly reserved for lower-ranking domestic servants. At the same time it has become a potentially lucrative career option.

== Notable butlers ==
- Eugene Allen, White House butler who served under seven U.S. presidents
- Leslie Bartlett, butler, toastmaster; and founder of The London School of British Butlers
- Paul Burrell, butler to Diana, Princess of Wales
- Alonzo Fields, White House chief butler from 1932 to 1953
- Grant Harrold, butler to King Charles III, then-Prince of Wales, from 2004 to 2011

== In visual art ==
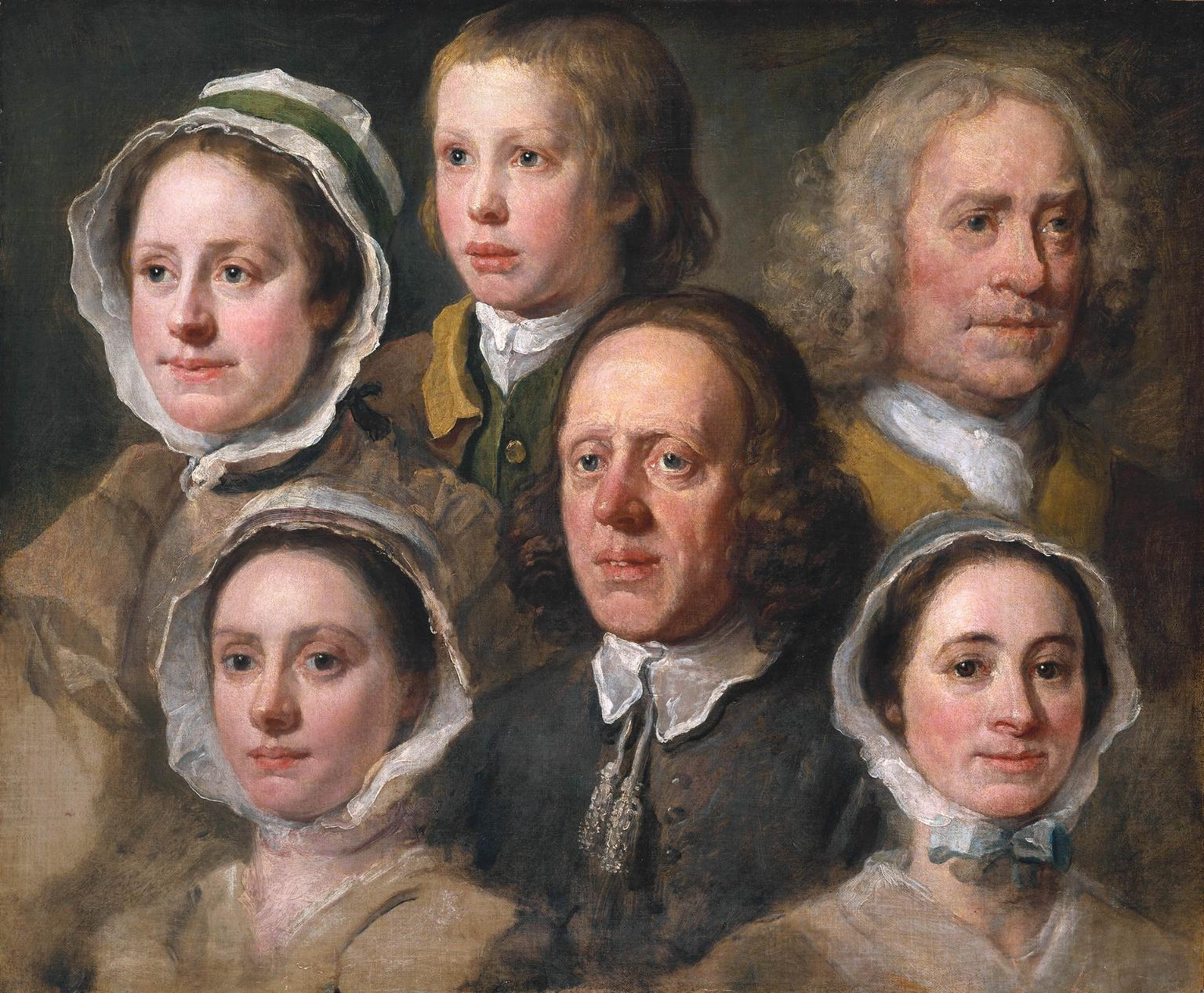
Heads of Six of Hogarth's Servants

Butlers have been occasionally depicted in visual art. A famous painting, Heads of Six of Hogarth's Servants (c. 1758), is unique among such works. In it, the 18th-century English artist William Hogarth depicted his household servants, all surrounding the butler. In showing the group in a close-knit assemblage rather than in the performance of their routine household duties, Hogarth sought to humanise and dignify them in a manner akin to wealthy-class members, who were the normal subjects of such portraits. While this was a subversive act that certainly raised many eyebrows in his day—Hogarth conspicuously displayed the work in his estate home in full view of guests—at the same time he had painted his servants' facial expressions to convey the sincerity and deference expected of servant-class members.

In contemporary art, "The Butler's in Love" series by U.S. artist Mark Stock is especially poignant. In the series, Stock portrays the butler as sick with love, but the possibility of fulfillment is hopeless: the love is a forbidden love, perhaps felt for the lady of the house, and so it must be suffered alone in silent concealment. In addition to the ongoing mannerisms and facial expressions of the butler, a seated lady once appearing in a curtained room and a recurring lipstick-stained absinthe glass over which the butler obsesses provide the interpretive clues. In selecting a butler as his subject, Stock sought to provide a "universal character", a pathos-laden figure that could be widely related to and that could depict the universality of loneliness felt by someone who can only look in from the outside. Stock began the series in 1985 to express his difficult feelings during a personal experience of unrequited love. One of the paintings was inspiration for a 3-D short film, "The Butler's in Love" by actor/director David Arquette, shot in 2008 at San Francisco's historic Westerfield Mansion.

== In fiction ==
The real-life modern butler attempts to be discreet and unobtrusive, friendly but not familiar, keenly anticipative of the needs of his or her employer, and graceful and precise in execution of duty. The butler of fiction, by contrast, often tends to be larger than life and has become a plot device in literature and a traditional role in the performing arts. Butlers may provide comic relief with wry comments, clues as to the perpetrators of various crimes, and are represented as at least as intelligent and moral as their "betters", or even more so. They are often portrayed as being serious and expressionless and in the case that the wealthy hero is an orphan‒such as Batman, Chrono Crusade's Satella Harvenheit, or Tomb Raider's Lara Croft‒may be a father figure to said hero. Regardless of the genre in which they are cast, butlers in fiction almost invariably follow the "British butler" model and are given an appropriate-sounding surname. The fictional butler tends to be given a typical Anglo-Celtic surname and have an English accent. The Asian, African American, or Caribbean houseboy is a variant, but even these major-domos are based on the British icon.

Today, butlers are usually portrayed as being refined and well-spoken. However, in 19th century fiction such as Dracula, butlers generally spoke with a strong Cockney or other regional accent.

"The butler" is integral to the plot of countless potboilers and melodramas, whether or not the character has been given a name. Butlers figure so prominently in period pieces and whodunits that they can be considered stock characters in film and theatre, where a catchphrase is "The butler did it!"

The best-known fictional manservant, and the archetype of the quintessential British butler, is himself not a butler at all but instead a valet: Reginald Jeeves, the iconic creation of author P. G. Wodehouse, is a "gentleman's gentleman" and general factotum. Probably the best-known fictional butlers are Alfred from the Batman comic and films; Hudson of Upstairs, Downstairs television fame; Mr Carson from the Downton Abbey television series; and Crichton from J. M. Barrie's The Admirable Crichton. Lesser-knowns include Mr. Belvedere from the novel Belvedere, which was adapted into a feature film with sequels and later a television series; Lurch, from the television series The Addams Family, based on Charles Addams' The New Yorker cartoons; Beach, from the Wodehouse series about Blandings Castle; Niles, the butler at the Sheffield house in American sitcom The Nanny, Geoffrey from The Fresh Prince of Bel Air, Bailey (an English canine butler) from the children's animated television series Arthur and Benson from the two series Soap and Benson. The character of Kryten in the science-fiction sitcom Red Dwarf is a mechanoid butler with a name inspired by The Admirable Crichton.

Not all fictional butlers portray the "butler stereotype", however. Alan Bates, who played the butler Jennings in the film Gosford Park, was coached in brooding detail by Arthur Inch, a longtime real-life butler. Mr. Stevens, the butler played by Anthony Hopkins in the film Remains of the Day, was also acted with remarkable realism. A female butler, Sarah Stevens, is the principal character in Linda Howard's 2002 Dying to Please, a murder/romance novel. Howard gives detailed and generally accurate descriptions of butlering in the work.

=== Examples ===
- Alfred Pennyworth, Bruce Wayne's butler from Batman
- Angus Hudson, from the television show Upstairs, Downstairs
- Edwin Jarvis, Tony Stark's butler from Iron Man
- Nestor, the butler of Marlinspike Hall in The Adventures of Tintin
- Sebastian Beach, from the Blandings Castle stories by P. G. Wodehouse, frequently conspires with the clever Gally Threepwood

== See also ==
- Butler of Scotland
- Chauffeur
- Domestic worker
- Footman
- Household
- Housekeeper
- Maid
- Valet

== Notes ==
- This article is based on material from "A Brief History of Butlers and Butlering" by Stephen Ewen, which is licensed under the Creative Common Attribution-Share Alike 3.0 Unported License.
- The article there is a mirror copy of "A Brief History of Butlers and Butlering" by Stephen Ewen.
