= Gosford Park =

2001 mystery film directed by Robert Altman

- Theatrical release poster
- Directed by: Robert Altman
- Written by: Julian Fellowes
- Based on: An idea by: Robert Altman; Bob Balaban
- Produced by: Robert Altman; Bob Balaban; David Levy
- Starring: Eileen Atkins; Bob Balaban; Alan Bates; Charles Dance; Stephen Fry; Michael Gambon; Richard E. Grant; Derek Jacobi; Kelly Macdonald; Helen Mirren; Jeremy Northam; Clive Owen; Ryan Phillippe; Maggie Smith; Kristin Scott Thomas; Emily Watson
- Cinematography: Andrew Dunn
- Edited by: Tim Squyres
- Music by: Patrick Doyle
- Production companies: USA Films; Capitol Films; Film Council; Sandcastle 5 Productions; Chicagofilms; Medusa Film
- Distributed by: Entertainment Film Distributors (United Kingdom); USA Films (United States); Medusa Distribuzione (Italy)
- Release dates: 7 November 2001 (LFF); 26 December 2001 (United States); 1 February 2002 (United Kingdom)
- Running time: 137 minutes
- Countries: United Kingdom; United States; Italy
- Language: English
- Budget: $19.8 million
- Box office: $87.8 million

Gosford Park is a 2001 satirical black comedy mystery film directed by Robert Altman and written by Julian Fellowes. The film, which is influenced by Jean Renoir's French classic The Rules of the Game, follows a party of wealthy Britons plus an American film producer, and their servants, who in 1932 gather for a shooting weekend at Gosford Park, an English country house. A murder occurs after a dinner party, and the film goes on to present the subsequent investigation from the servants' and guests' perspectives.

Co-produced in the United Kingdom, the United States and Italy, the film has an ensemble cast including Eileen Atkins, Bob Balaban, Alan Bates, Charles Dance, Stephen Fry, Michael Gambon, Richard E. Grant, Derek Jacobi, Kelly Macdonald, Helen Mirren, Jeremy Northam, Clive Owen, Ryan Phillippe, Maggie Smith, Kristin Scott Thomas and Emily Watson.

Development on Gosford Park began in 1999, when Bob Balaban asked Altman if they could develop a film together. Balaban suggested an Agatha Christie–style whodunit and introduced Altman to Julian Fellowes, with whom Balaban had been working on a different project. The film went into production in March 2001, and began filming at Shepperton Studios with a production budget of $19.8 million. Gosford Park premiered on 7 November 2001 at the London Film Festival. It received a limited release across cinemas in the United States in December 2001, before being widely released in January 2002 by USA Films. It was released in February 2002 in the United Kingdom.

The film was successful at the box office, grossing over $87 million in cinemas worldwide, making it Altman's second-most successful film after M*A*S*H. Widely acclaimed by critics, Gosford Park was nominated for seven Academy Awards, including Best Picture, Best Director and Best Supporting Actress for both Mirren and Smith, and won Best Original Screenplay; it was also nominated for nine British Academy Film Awards, winning two.

The TV series Downton Abbey – written and created by Fellowes – was originally planned as a spin-off of Gosford Park, but instead was developed as a standalone property inspired by the film, and set earlier in the 20th century (from 1912 to the mid-1920s).

== Plot ==
In 1932, Sir William McCordle, his wife Lady Sylvia, and their daughter Isobel host a shooting party at their country estate, Gosford Park. Among the guests are Sylvia's sisters Louisa and Lavinia and their husbands Lord Stockbridge and Commander Anthony Meredith; her aunt Constance, Countess of Trentham; the Hon. Freddie and Mabel Nesbitt; actor Ivor Novello and American film producer Morris Weissman. Lord Rupert Standish and Jeremy Blond arrive later.

Mrs Wilson, the housekeeper, assigns the visiting servants to their rooms and overhears Robert Parks, Lord Stockbridge's valet, mention being raised in an orphanage. Head housemaid Elsie tutors Lady Trentham's inexperienced maid, Mary MacEachran.

Following dinner, a silver carving knife is missing. Henry Denton, Weissman's valet, raises the staff's suspicions with intrusive questions and a seemingly Scottish accent (which Mary, Scottish herself, sees through). Later that evening, Henry has a tryst with Lady Sylvia. Isobel asks Elsie to speak to Sir William about hiring Freddie, who is blackmailing Isobel over their affair and her aborted pregnancy. Freddie mistreats Mabel, whom he married for her money but whose wealth he overestimated. Lady Trentham confides to Mary that Sylvia and Louisa cut cards to decide which of them would marry Sir William.

When the men go shooting, a stray shot grazes Sir William's ear. The ladies join them for lunch, and Sir William withdraws from Anthony's business scheme, leaving him financially ruined. Lady Sylvia informs her aunt Constance that Sir William may halt her allowance.

During dinner, Lady Sylvia berates Sir William and Elsie comes to his defence, exposing their affair; she is summarily dismissed. After dinner, Sir William retires alone to his study for the rest of the evening, where Mrs Wilson brings him coffee. The guests gather in the drawing room as Novello plays the piano and sings, with the servants listening outside; Freddie, Anthony, Robert, and footman George each slip away. A man, seen only by his trousers, enters the library with the missing carving knife and, finding Sir William seemingly asleep in his chair, stabs him in the chest.

After the body is discovered, bumbling Inspector Thompson and competent Constable Dexter arrive to investigate. They discover Sir William was poisoned before being stabbed. Mrs Croft, the head cook, tells her staff about Sir William's history of seducing his female factory workers; those who became pregnant were forced to give their babies up for adoption or lose their jobs. Isobel gives Freddie a cheque, which he angrily tears up when confronted by Mabel. Deferential to the upper class, Inspector Thompson releases the guests with cursory interviews and does not interview most of the staff, who he believes would not have any motive for murder.

Mary deduces that Parks is the killer; when she confronts Parks, he reveals he is the illegitimate son of Sir William and that his dead mother was one of Sir William's factory workers. Since Parks did not poison Sir William, he must already have been dead when Parks stabbed him. Parks tells Mary that he is glad that Sir William is dead and does not care who is responsible.

As guests and their servants depart, Freddie, his blackmail of Isobel having failed, pursues a partnership with Anthony, whose business venture has been saved by Sir William's death. Isobel overhears Rupert's conversation with Blond abruptly ending his courtship upon learning of the limits of Isobel’s inheritance.

Lady Trentham and Lady Sylvia discuss Mrs Croft and Mrs Wilson's long-standing feud, and Lady Sylvia reveals that Mrs Wilson's surname used to be Parks, Parker or Parkinson. Overhearing, Mary deduces that Mrs Wilson killed to protect her son, Parks. Mary speaks to Mrs Wilson, who admits that she and Mrs Croft are sisters and both had children by Sir William while working at his factory. Mrs Croft kept her baby and lost her job, though the child died in infancy, while Mrs Wilson gave up her son, naively believing Sir William would find an adoptive family. Realizing Parks was her son who intended to kill his father, she poisoned Sir William to prevent his crime; consequently, his only transgression was stabbing a dead body.

Mrs Croft comforts Mrs Wilson as Mary says goodbye to Parks and the last guests leave.

== Characters and cast ==
=== Above stairs ===
- Michael Gambon as Sir William McCordle, a wealthy industrialist and baronet
- Kristin Scott Thomas as Lady Sylvia McCordle, Sir William's wife, daughter of the Earl of Carton, an old but impoverished family
- Camilla Rutherford as Isobel McCordle, daughter of Sir William and Lady Sylvia
- Maggie Smith as Constance, Dowager Countess of Trentham, Lady Sylvia's aunt
- Charles Dance as Raymond, Lord Stockbridge, a baron who is Lady Sylvia's brother-in-law via his marriage to Louisa
- Geraldine Somerville as Louisa, Lady Stockbridge, Lady Sylvia's younger sister
- Tom Hollander as Lt Commander Anthony Meredith, broke and desperate, married to Lavinia
- Natasha Wightman as Lady Lavinia Meredith, Lady Sylvia's youngest sister
- James Wilby as the Hon. Freddie Nesbitt, a late invitee who is also son of a baron and recently unemployed
- Claudie Blakley as Mabel, the Hon. Mrs Nesbitt, daughter of a glove factory owner, grew up in Leicester, and married to Freddie, who only married her believing her to be wealthy
- Jeremy Northam as Ivor Novello, Sir William's cousin who is also a British matinee idol and film star
- Bob Balaban as Morris Weissman, American film producer, friend of Ivor Novello
- Laurence Fox as Lord Rupert Standish, Isobel's boyfriend, and penniless younger son of a marquess
- Trent Ford as Jeremy Blond, friend of Lord Rupert

=== Below stairs ===
- Kelly Macdonald as Mary Maceachran, lady's maid to the Countess of Trentham
- Clive Owen as Robert Parks, Lord Stockbridge's valet, grew up in an orphanage in Isleworth, London
- Helen Mirren as Mrs Wilson, housekeeper
- Eileen Atkins as Mrs Croft, the cook
- Alan Bates as Mr Jennings, butler
- Emily Watson as Elsie, head-housemaid, Sir William's mistress
- Derek Jacobi as Probert, Sir William's valet
- Richard E. Grant as George, first footman
- Jeremy Swift as Arthur, footman
- Sophie Thompson as Dorothy, still-room maid
- Meg Wynn Owen as Lewis, lady's maid to Lady Sylvia
- Adrian Scarborough as Barnes, valet to Lt. Commander Anthony Meredith
- Ryan Phillippe as Henry Denton, an American actor posing as valet to Morris Weissman
- Frances Low as Sarah, lady's maid to Lady Lavinia
- Joanna Maude as Renee, lady's maid to Louisa, Lady Stockbridge
- Teresa Churcher as Bertha, kitchen maid
- Frank Thornton as Mr Burkett, the Countess of Trentham's butler

=== Visitors ===
- Stephen Fry as Inspector Thompson
- Ron Webster as Constable Dexter

== Themes ==
The film is a study of the British class system during the 1930s; Stephen Fry, Inspector Thompson in the film, says that it shows the upper class's dependency on a servant class. A number of secondary themes are also explored. For example, the film takes a subtle look at sexual mores during the 1930s. As it is set in 1932, between the world wars, the impact of the First World War is explored in the film's screenplay. It mentions the decline of the British Empire and the peerage system. Writing for PopMatters, Cynthia Fuchs described surface appearances, rather than complex interpersonal relationships, as a theme of the film.

Salon critic Steven Johnson notes a revival of the manor house mystery style, popularised by the writings of Agatha Christie, in the screenplay for Gosford Park. He called it a blend between this literary style and that of the 19th century novel. Bob Balaban, an actor and producer for Gosford Park, says that the idea of creating a murder mystery told by the servants in the manor was an interesting one for him and Altman.

Themes from the film were picked up and integrated into the series Downton Abbey by Julian Fellowes. Maggie Smith starred again in her role as a dowager countess, this time her title not being Trentham but Grantham; the family are related to the Marquess (rather than the Earl) of Flintshire.

== Production ==
=== Development and writing ===
In 1999, Bob Balaban asked Robert Altman if there were something they could develop together, and Altman suggested a whodunit. Altman wanted to create an Agatha Christie–like country house murder mystery that explored that way of life; he called the film a "classic situation: all suspects under one roof". Altman was also inspired by the 1930s films The Rules of the Game and Charlie Chan in London. Altman chose British actor and writer Julian Fellowes to write the screenplay, because Fellowes knew how country houses operated. Fellowes, who had never written a feature film before, received a telephone call from Altman, who asked him to come up with some characters and stories.

Fellowes was given a brief outline of the film: it was to be "set in a country house in the '30s and to have a murder in there somewhere, but for it to really be an examination of class". Altman also wanted the film to explore the three groups of people: the family, the guests, and the servants. Of the call, Fellowes said: "All the way through I thought this can't be happening—a 50-year-old fat balding actor is phoned up by an American movie director—but I did work as if it was going to happen".

The original title of the film was The Other Side of the Tapestry, but Altman thought it was awkward. Fellowes began looking through some books and came up with Gosford Park. Altman said: "Nobody liked it, everyone fought me on it. But when you make a picture using a name, that's its name. It's not a gripping title. But then M*A*S*H wasn't either."

Fellowes says the screenplay was "not an homage to Agatha Christie, but a reworking of that genre". Fellowes was credited not only as the film's writer but as a technical advisor as well, meaning he wrote portions of the film as it was being produced. He notes that in certain large scenes with many characters, the actors were left room to improvise.

Arthur Inch, the retired butler of Sir Richard and Lady Kleinwort, was the consultant on correct procedures and arrangements for dining on the set. Inch is credited as "Butler" immediately before Altman as Director in the final credits. Ruth Mott was the consultant for the kitchen, and Violet Liddle for the parlour maids.

=== Casting ===
In Gosford Park, as in many of his other films, Altman had a list of actors he intended to appear in the film before it was cast formally. The film's casting director was Mary Selway, whom producer David Levy described as knowing many British actors. Very few actors who were offered parts did not end up in the film. Jude Law dropped out of the production just before the shoot began, and he was replaced by Ryan Phillippe. Kenneth Branagh and Robert Bathurst were both tied down by scheduling conflicts. Alan Rickman, Joely Richardson and Judi Dench were also considered for roles in the film. The cast is notable for featuring two knights (Michael Gambon and Derek Jacobi) and two dames (Eileen Atkins and Maggie Smith). Alan Bates and Stephen Fry would later be knighted and Helen Mirren and Kristin Scott Thomas made dames.

=== Filming and editing ===
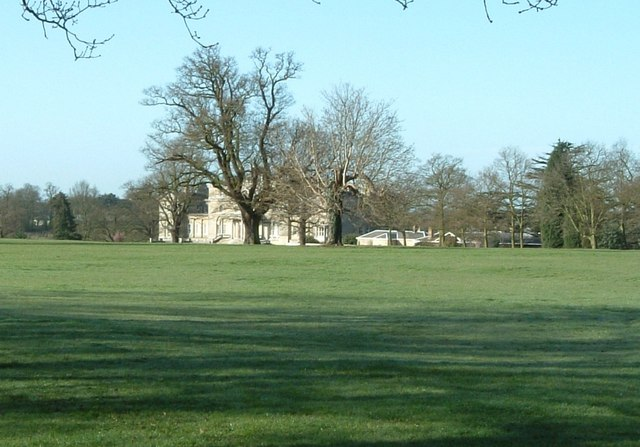
Wrotham Park in Hertfordshire, where the outdoor and ground floor scenes for Gosford Park were shot

Filming was conducted at Wrotham Park, a country house to the north of London, for the exteriors, staircase, dining room and drawing room, and Syon House in west London for the upstairs bedrooms. The opening sequence outside Lady Trentham's home was shot at Hall Barn, near Beaconsfield, Buckinghamshire, whose grounds were also used as the scene for lunch after the shoot. Sound stages were built to film the scenes of the manor's downstairs area. Shepperton Studios was used for off-location filming. Filming began on 19 March 2001. During production, Stephen Frears acted as a standby director, ready to replace Altman in case he was incapacitated, so that the film would receive insurance.

The film was shot with two cameras, both moving perpetually in opposite directions. The cameras pointed toward no specific area, intended to cause the audience to move their eyes throughout the scene. Altman notes that most of the film's cast had experience in theatre and in film, meaning they had acted in situations where the view of the audience is not on one specific actor, and each audience member sees a slightly different image of the players on stage. Richard E. Grant commented that having two cameras moving at any one time meant that none of the actors knew when the cameras were focused on them. As a result, the actors had to stay "completely in character, completely in the moment, and interact with everybody in a way that felt as close to real life as you could possibly conjure up". Andrew Dunn, the film's cinematographer, appreciated the co-operative nature of Gosford Park's filming process. He shot the film on Kodak Vision Expression 500T film stock generally with two Panavision cameras, using lighting ranging from relatively dim candles to bright hydrargyrum medium-arc iodide lamps. Tim Squyres, the editor, described the editing process on Gosford Park as an unusual one, as the dual cameras used were generally located in the same areas when filming, instead of the more standard method of setting up a scene directly.

=== Soundtrack ===
Patrick Doyle composed the film's score. Doyle said that it can take him up to six months to create a film score, but Altman asked him to write and compose the music for Gosford Park in less than five weeks. Doyle recorded the soundtrack at the London Air-Edel Recording Studios in October 2001. The soundtrack also features six original songs by composer and playwright Ivor Novello. Jeremy Northam, who plays Novello, sings five of the songs and his brother, Christopher, accompanies him on the piano. Christopher also performs one Novello song as a piano solo. The soundtrack was released on 15 January 2002.

== Release ==
=== Premiere and theatrical release ===
Gosford Park premiered on 7 November 2001 at the London Film Festival. The film then received a limited release across cinemas in the United States on 26 December 2001, before being widely released in January 2002 by USA Films. It was released on 1 February 2002 in the United Kingdom.

=== Home media ===
The VHS and region 1 DVD of Gosford Park were released on 25 June 2002 by Universal Studios Home Video, with the region 2 release on 3 December 2002. The critic Ed Gonzalez reviewed the DVD negatively, calling the picture quality "atrocious on the small screen", going on to say that "the image quality of this video transfer is downright lousy from start to finish". However, reviewer Robert Mack generally wrote favourably of the picture quality, noting excellence in the shots' detail and sharpness and the lack of compression artefacts, but describing an unfavourable darkness to scenes filmed within the manor house. Both reviewers commented positively on the film's score and soundtrack. Gonzalez wrote that "Gosford Park sounds amazing for a film so dialogue-dependent" and Mack that "the audio transfer is about as good as it can get on a movie of this style".

On 26 November 2018, Arrow Films released a newly restored 2K remaster, taken from a 4K print of Gosford Park, on Limited Edition Blu-ray in the UK.

== Reception ==
=== Box office ===
In its limited release opening weekend, the film grossed $241,219, hitting No. 23 in the box office that weekend. In its wide release, it grossed $3,395,759; by the end of its run on 6 June 2002, Gosford Park grossed $41,308,615 in the domestic box office and a worldwide total of $87,754,044. With that final total, Gosford Park became Altman's second-most successful film at the box office after his 1970 film M*A*S*H.

=== Critical response ===
Review aggregator Rotten Tomatoes reports that 87% of 157 critics have given the film a positive review, with an average rating of 7.9/10. The site's critics consensus reads: "A mixture of Upstairs, Downstairs; Clue; and perceptive social commentary, Gosford Park ranks among director Altman's best". Metacritic assigned the film a weighted average score of 90 out of 100, based on 34 critics, indicating "universal acclaim".

Roger Ebert awarded it his four out of four stars, describing the story as "such a joyous and audacious achievement it deserves comparison with his [Robert Altman's] very best movies". Ebert specifically noted a quality of the film that many Altman films share: a focus on character rather than plot. Emanuel Levy gave Gosford Park an A minus rating, describing one of its themes as "illuminating a society and a way of life on the verge of extinction", placing the interwar setting as an integral part of the film's class study. However, he noted that, because Altman is an independent observer of the society he portrays in the film, it does not have the biting qualities of his previous social commentaries such as Short Cuts, set in the director's home country of the United States. Jonathan Rosenbaum in the Chicago Reader called it a masterpiece.

Gosford Park's cinematography was a focus of several critics. CNN's Paul Clinton praised Andrew Dunn's camera work, describing it as "lush and rich; the camera glides up and down the stairs of the grand estate, the period look is beautifully crafted". Ed Gonzalez of the online publication Slant wrote that "Altman's camera is the star of Gosford Park" and that the film's cinematography is used as an aid to its storytelling. Michael Phillips placed Gosford Park at number nine on his list of Best Films of the Decade. The film was placed at 82 on Slant's list of best films of the 2000s.

In July 2025, it ranked number 72 on Rolling Stone's list of "The 100 Best Movies of the 21st Century."

=== Accolades and awards ===
Gosford Park was nominated for 61 different awards following its release, winning 25 of them. There were seven nominations for Academy Awards (including Best Picture and Best Director, both of which it lost to A Beautiful Mind); Fellowes won the Best Original Screenplay. At the 55th British Academy Film Awards, the film was nominated for nine British Academy awards, winning Best British Film and Best Costume Design (Jenny Beavan). Mirren, Smith and Watson were all nominated for Best European Actress at the European Film Awards. The film received five nominations at the 59th Golden Globe Awards; Altman won the Award for 'Best Director'.

At the 8th Screen Actors Guild Awards Mirren won Outstanding Performance by a Female Actor in a Supporting Role and the ensemble cast collectively won Outstanding Performance by a Cast in a Motion Picture. The film won four more Best Cast awards from the Broadcast Film Critics Association, the Florida Film Critics Circle and the Online Film Critics Society. Fellowes received recognition for the film's screenplay from the Writers Guild of America, where he won the Best Original Screenplay award. The film's score composer, Patrick Doyle, received two nominations for his work. Doyle was nominated for Composer of the Year from the American Film Institute and he won the award for Soundtrack Composer of the Year from the World Soundtrack Awards.
