= Housekeeper (domestic worker) =

Domestic worker responsible for running the household, in charge of housemaids

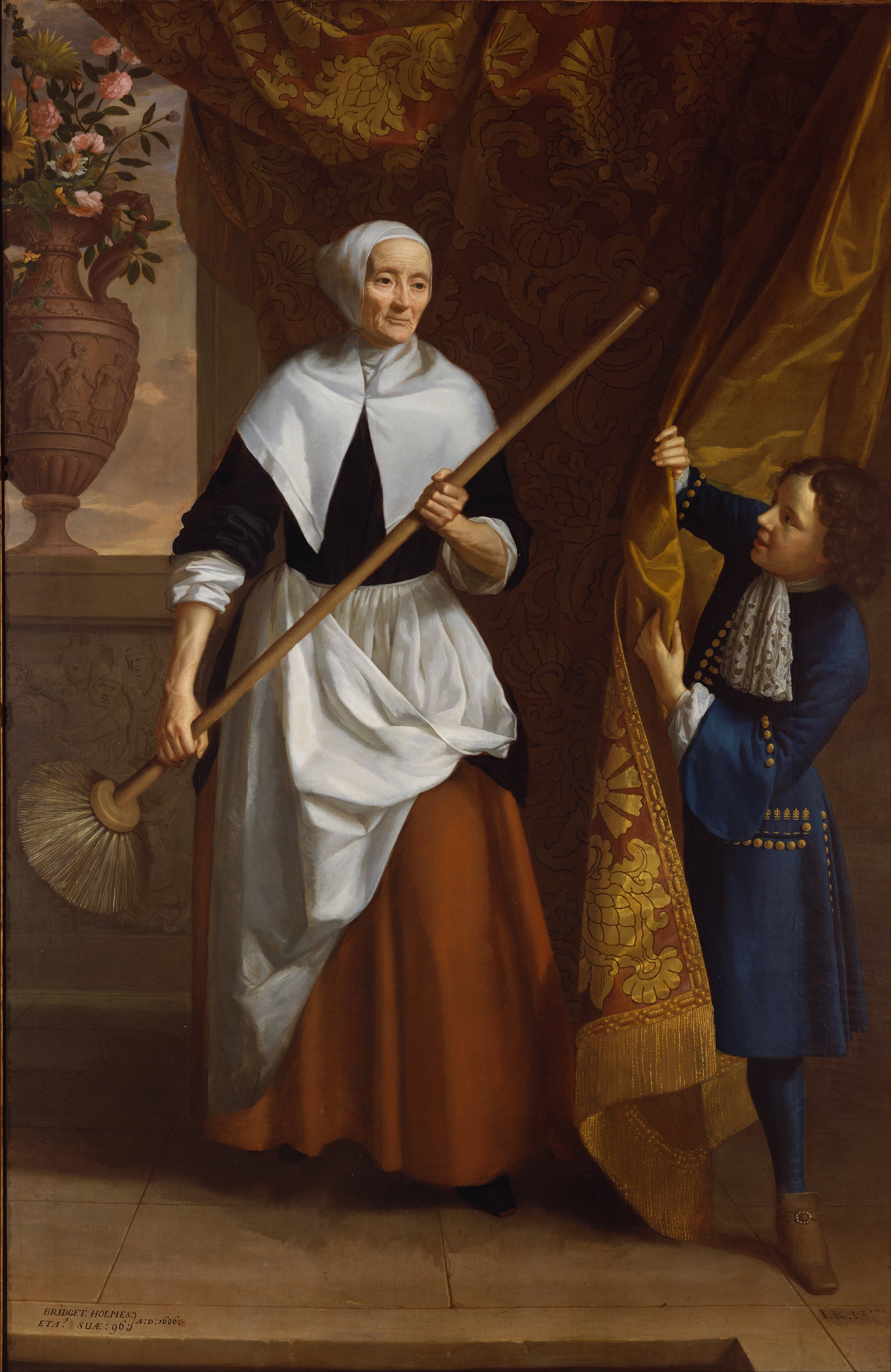
Bridget Holmes was a necessary woman for a series of five monarchs, from Charles I to Mary II and so was one of the longest-serving royal servants.

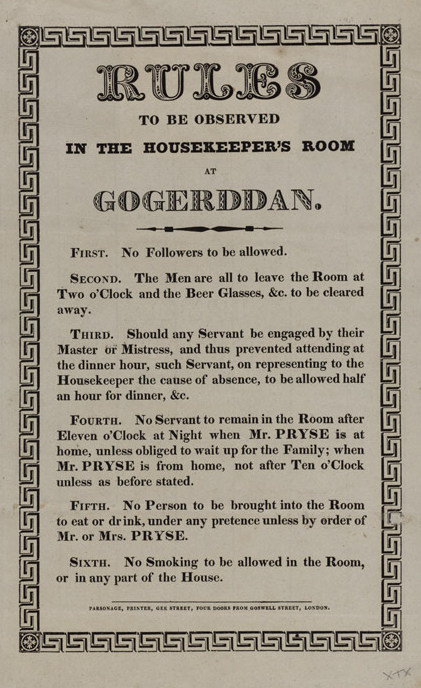
Rules to be observed by the Housekeeper of a country house in Victorian Britain

A housekeeper — also called necessary woman — is a person responsible for the supervision of a house's cleaning and kitchen staff, particularly being in charge of all female staff. The housekeeper may also perform some light catering and cleaning duties. This female role is on a social parity with that of the male butler.

== History ==
In the great houses of the eighteenth, nineteenth and early twentieth centuries, the housekeeper could be a woman of considerable power in the domestic arena. The housekeeper of times past had her room (or rooms) cleaned by junior staff, her meals prepared and laundry taken care of, and with the butler presided over dinner in the servants' hall. Unlike most other servants, she was addressed as mistress or missus regardless of her marital status.

The housekeeper is generally hired by and reports to the lady of the house. The extent to which the housekeeper supervises other staff varies from household to household. In general, the staff of a grand dwelling is divided into departments, with the housekeeper in charge of all the female staff with the possible exception of the kitchen staff, who report to the cook, and the between staff, who may report to the butler; in these cases the cook and butler reported directly to the lady of the house.

In other households, particularly those of the very wealthy who maintain several residences, the housekeeper is the ultimate head of household staff and may hire and/or fire junior staff, subject to the approval of the lady of the house, and make recommendations for senior staff. In this case, the cook and butler report to the lady of the house through the housekeeper.

The housekeeper, also called a necessary woman, was a position in the UK's civil service and royal household. The duties were menial, housekeeping work such as emptying chamber pots.

== Today's cook-housekeeper ==
Today's head of household staff in a great house lives in much the same manner, although fewer households can afford large retinues of servants with an elaborate hierarchy.

In developed countries, fewer families can afford live-in help as they once did. Fewer hereditary grand households exist due to increasing costs of running large estates, increased domestic mechanisation requiring less labour, and improvements in education for all children — noticeably making a difference in the inter-war period — though a considerable number do exist in places such as the United Kingdom. Fewer families employ staff due to advances in technology and the lack of need to exhibit social status.

In nations where there is still a ready supply of inexpensive labour (e.g. Tanzania), the middle classes may still be able to afford servants. For these households, the remnant of the once grand position of head housekeeper is often a cook-housekeeper. The modern cook-housekeeper performs cooking and cleaning duties.

In countries such as the United States, the United Kingdom, and France there has been a rise in people employing domestic staff.

== Fictional housekeepers ==
The following is a list of fictional characters who perform the role of a traditional housekeeper that supervises other servants.

- Mrs Reynolds of Pemberley in Jane Austen's 1813 novel Pride and Prejudice.
- Mrs Hodges of Donwell Abbey in Jane Austen's 1815 novel Emma.
- Dorothy of Northanger Abbey in Jane Austen's 1817 novel Northanger Abbey.
- Alice Fairfax of Thornfield Hall in Charlotte Brontë's 1847 novel Jane Eyre.
- Nelly Dean and Zillah of Thrushcross Grange and Wuthering Heights in Emily Brontë's 1847 novel Wuthering Heights.
- Mrs Medlock of Misselthwaite Manor in Frances Hodgson Burnett's 1911 novel The Secret Garden.
- Mrs Twemlow of Blandings Castle in P.G. Wodehouse's 1915 novel Something Fresh.
- Elizabeth Russell of Fernly Park in Agatha Christie's 1926 novel The Murder of Roger Ackroyd.
- Mrs Danvers of Manderley in Daphne du Maurier's 1938 novel Rebecca.
- Mrs Macready in C.S. Lewis's 1950 novel The Lion, the Witch and the Wardrobe.
- Miss Kenton in the 1989 novel The Remains of the Day by Kazuo Ishiguro, portrayed by Emma Thompson in the 1993 big-screen film adaptation
- Mrs Wilson of Gosford Park in the 2001 film Gosford Park.
- Mrs Doyle of Craggy Island household in the 1995–1998 television series Father Ted.
- Elsie Hughes of Downton Abbey in the television series Downton Abbey (2010–2015).
- Kim Yi-han in 2011 South Korean television series Manny (2011).
- Akari Mita of Asuda household in 2011 Japanese television series I'm Mita, Your Housekeeper. (2011).
- Park Bok-nyeo of Eun household in 2013 South Korean television series The Suspicious Housekeeper (2013).
- Mikuri Moriyama of Tsuzaki household in 2016 Japanese television series The Full-Time Wife Escapist (2016).
- Unnamed housekeeper of the hotel in 2024 Taiwanese television series Urban Horror (2024).

== See also ==
- Au pair
- Bedder
- Domestic worker
- Footman
- Household staff
- Maid
- Maid service
- Nanny
