= Margaret Powell =

English writer (1907–1984)

- Born: 1907
- Died: April 1984 (aged 76–77)
- Occupation: Writer
- Notable work: Below Stairs

Margaret Powell (1907 – April 1984) was an English writer. Her book about her experiences in domestic service, Below Stairs, became a best-seller. She went on to write other books and became a television personality. Below Stairs was an impetus for Upstairs, Downstairs, the basis of Beryl's Lot, and one of the inspirations for Downton Abbey.

== Early life and domestic service ==
Ellen Margaret Steer's father, Harry, was seasonally employed as a house painter and her mother, Florence, was a charwoman. Her parents and her grandmother lived in three rooms in Hove, Sussex and she had six siblings. When she was 13 and won a scholarship to grammar school, her parents could not afford to allow her to take it up. She went to work in a laundry until she was 15 and became a maid, first locally and a year later in London. Since she had experience of cooking at home and hated needlework, she became a kitchen maid instead of a slightly more prestigious under-housemaid.

After "set[ting] about [finding a husband] as if it were an extra household duty, like hulling five pounds of strawberries or mopping the linoleum floor", she escaped domestic service by marrying a milkman, Albert Powell. When her three sons were in grammar school, she became a maid once more. Eventually, "when I realised I had nothing to talk about with my eldest son, who was preparing to go to university", she took evening school courses in philosophy, history and literature, passed her O-levels at 58, and went on to A-levels, passing the English A-level in 1969.

== Writing career and later life ==
She published her memoir, Below Stairs, in 1968. It sold well, 14,000 copies in its first year, and was followed by other autobiographical books beginning the following year. She also wrote some novels. She became a popular guest on television talk shows.

When she died in April 1984 at 76 after suffering from cancer, she left a substantial estate of £77,000.

In her birthplace of Hove there is a bus named after her and a blue plaque on her house.

== Below Stairs ==
Below Stairs was one of a wave of working-class memoirs beginning in the 1950s, and is about class. She writes, "We always called them 'Them'"— but "defiantly individualistic" rather than socialist. Powell is bitter about the injustice of her situation, "very good at dramatising ... mortifying moments", and "throws the last shovel of dirt on the myth of the devoted help and their unfailing love and respect for the stately home". The book "prompted a storm of hurt letters". However, she has no time for politics and instead focuses on beating the odds: "Those people who say the rich should share what they've got are talking a lot of my eye and Betty Martin; it's only because they haven't got it they think that way ... [I]f I had it I'd hang on to it too." The Wall Street Journal's reviewer in 2012 called her "admirably feisty" and "wittily scathing of the class-bound cant conditioning Britain in the early decades of the 20th century."

Below Stairs inspired the television series Upstairs, Downstairs, which was created by two actresses whose mothers had also been in service. The series Beryl's Lot was based on it, and it was one of the inspirations for the series Downton Abbey, which began in 2011. The book was reissued that year in the UK as Below Stairs: The Bestselling Memoirs of a 1920s Kitchen Maid, and in 2012 was published for the first time in the US as Below Stairs: The Classic Kitchen Maid's Memoir That Inspired "Upstairs, Downstairs" and "Downton Abbey".

== Selected publications and reissues ==
- Below Stairs. London: Peter Davies, 1968. ISBN 9780432118009
- Below Stairs: the bestselling memoirs of a 1920s kitchen maid. London: Pan Macmillan, 2011. ISBN 9780330535380
- Below Stairs: the classic kitchen maid's memoir that inspired "Upstairs, Downstairs" and "Downton Abbey". New York: St Martin's Press, 2012. ISBN 9781250005441
- Climbing the Stairs. London: Peter Davies, 1969. ISBN 9780432118016
- Climbing the Stairs; From Kitchen Maid to Cook: the heartwarming memoir of a life in service. London: Pan, 2011. ISBN 9781447201960
- The Margaret Powell Cookery Book. London: Peter Davies, 1970 ISBN 0-432-11802-0
- Margaret Powell's London Season. London: Peter Davies, 1971 ISBN 0-432-11804-7
- The Treasure Upstairs. London: Peter Davies, 1970 ISBN 0-432-11803-9
