= Argyll (disambiguation) =

Argyll is an ancient shire and modern registration county of Scotland.

Argyll can also refer to:

== In Scotland ==
- Argyllshire (UK Parliament constituency) (1708–1983)
- Argyll and Bute, one of 32 unitary authority council areas in Scotland and a lieutenancy area
- Argyll and Bute (UK Parliament constituency)
- Argyll and Bute (Scottish Parliament constituency)
- Diocese of Argyll, a medieval bishopric
- Bishop of Argyll (12th–17th centuries), the ecclesiastical head of the Diocese of Argyll
- Duke of Argyll, a title in the Peerage of Scotland since 1701 and in the Peerage of the United Kingdom since 1892
- Argyll (car), a Scottish motor car marque manufactured from 1899 to 1932, and again from 1976 to around 1990
- Argyll jacket, a shorter than regular jacket with gauntlet cuffs and pocket flaps and front cutaway for wearing with a sporran and kilt

== Other ==
- Argyll, Edmonton, a residential neighbourhood in Alberta, Canada
- Argyll Foods, a defunct British supermarket chain, later rebranded as Safeway (UK)
- HMS Argyll, several ships of the Royal Navy
- Argyll CMS, Color Management Software
- Argyll Street, a road in Central London
- Argyll, Queensland, a locality in Australia
- Argyll (pattern) or argyle, a pattern consisting of diamonds in diagonal checkerboard arrangement

== See also ==
- Argyle (disambiguation)
- Argyll and Clyde, an operational area of the Crown Office and Procurator Fiscal Service
- Argyll and Sutherland Highlanders, a battalion of the Royal Regiment of Scotland
- Argyll and Sutherland Highlanders of Canada (Princess Louise's)
- Argyll Robertson pupil, a bilateral small pupil that constricts when the patient focuses on a near object; named after Douglas Moray Cooper Lamb Argyll Robertson
- Argyll Foods, was a supermarket operator in the United Kingdom
- Bishop of Argyll and the Isles (disambiguation)
- Diocese of Argyll and the Isles (disambiguation)
- Duke of Argyll's tea tree – see wolfberry
- Earl of Argyll's Regiment of Foot
- Glasgow Mid Argyll, a shinty club
- NHS Highland and Argyll, one of the fourteen regions of the Scottish National Health Service
- NHS Argyll and Clyde, a former health board area
- Argile (disambiguation)
- Argle (disambiguation)
