= List of obsolete occupations =

Flowchart to determine if an occupation should be included in the list of obsolete occupations

This is a list of obsolete occupations. To be included in this list an occupation must be completely, or to a great extent, obsolete. For example, there are still a few lamplighters retained for ceremonial or tourist purposes, but in the main the occupation is now obsolete. Similarly, there are still some manual switchboard operators and elevator operators which are required for historic equipment or security reasons, but these are now considered to be obsolete occupations. Occupations which appear to be obsolete in industrialized countries may still be carried out commercially in other parts of the world, for example charcoal burner. (Note: The list aims to cover notable obsolete occupations throughout the world. However, detailed historical occupation statistics tend to be confined to industrialized countries so that coverage is inevitably weaker outside the OECD.)

To be included in this list an obsolete occupation should in the past have employed significant numbers of workers (hundreds or thousands as evidenced by, for example, census data). Some rare occupations are included in this list, but only if they have notable practitioners, for example alchemist or phrenologist.

Terms which describe groups of people carrying out a variety of roles, but which are not specific occupations, are excluded from this list even if they are obsolete, for example conquistador or retinue. Terms describing positions which have a modern equivalent, and are thus not obsolete occupations, are excluded from this list, for example a dragoman would now be termed a diplomat; similarly a cunning woman would now be termed a practitioner of folk medicine. Terms describing a state of being rather than an occupation are excluded, for example castrato. Specialist terms for an occupation, even if they are obsolete, are excluded, for example the numerous historic terms for cavalry and courtesan. Foreign language terms for existing occupations are excluded, for example korobeinik or Laukkuryssä which are types of peddler. All types of forced labour, such as slavery and penal labour are excluded from this list as they are not paid occupations.

Only occupations which are notable, well-defined, and adequately documented in secondary sources are included in this list.

== Reasons for occupations to become obsolete ==
An occupation may become obsolete for a single reason, or for a combination of reasons. Reasons for occupations to become obsolete fall into a number of groups.

The articulated pannier was a late 1700s fashion which fell out of favor.

Cultural or fashion change

The services or products provided by the occupation were made unappealing by cultural changes, including changes in prevalent aesthetic preferences.

For example hoop skirt and crinoline manufacturers were significant employers in the 1850s and 1860s but they declined significantly in later years as fashions changed.

Child work

Many forms of child work are now considered unacceptable. Following the elimination of much child labour, many more children could attend school.

For instance, climbing boys became unacceptable because of the danger to children involved in the job.

Debunked

The fundamental assumptions behind the occupation were proved wrong, as occurred with superseded scientific theories (e.g., phrenologists).

Economic change

The occupation was made inefficient by changes in the market or other economic factors (e.g.,the reduction in domestic servants caused by increased wages and alternative employment opportunities).

Environmental change

Changing natural factors made the occupation less useful or impossible, often as a direct consequence of the activity itself (e.g. over-farming, over-exploitation, deforestation).

For example, the trading of ivory has become heavily restricted over recent decades, especially in the Western world, following the international CITES agreement and local legislation, which has put ivory carvers out of work.

Legal, political and regulatory change

The occupation was outlawed, or changes in governance, law or politics caused its disappearance or decline.

For example, the Victorian-era law that made available more cadavers to medical schools, thus signalling the death-knell to body snatchers. Another example of a political change causing job obsolescence is the disappearance of the workhouse as a way of dealing with the poor.

Social change

The occupation was displaced by transformations of social roles or was made useless by other social changes.

Technological, scientific and process efficiency change

The occupation was displaced by technological innovation, with more effective or efficient ways for the same need representing the central focus of the product or service delivered by the occupation.

Historical examples are making lime in factories on a large scale rather than by lime-burners on a small scale and the continuous changes in occupations in the textile industry in the 19th century as a result of mechanization.

In recent times, the workplace impact of artificial intelligence has arisen as a concern for widespread job changes and/or decline.

== List of obsolete occupations ==
The table lists information about obsolete occupations

Occupation: name of the occupation
Description: description of the occupation
Reason: reason for the occupation becoming obsolete
Type: primary type of reason for the occupation becoming obsolete

Cultur - Cultural change (includes fashion change)
Child - Child work change
Debunk - Debunked as pseudoscience
Econom - Economic change
Envir - Environmental change
Legal - Legal change (includes political change and regulatory change)
Social - Social change
Tech - Technological change (includes scientific change and process efficiency change)

Start: century that the occupation started, for example -3 indicates 3rd century BC and -99 indicates prehistoric
End: century that the occupation ended, for example 15 indicates 15th century AD
Image: image of the occupation

Key: Common occupation Rare occupation

| Occupation | Description | Reason | Type | Start | End | Image |
|---|---|---|---|---|---|---|
| Alchemist | Alchemists attempted to create and purify certain materials. Common aims were the transmutation of "base metals" (e.g., lead) into "noble metals" (particularly gold), the creation of an elixir of immortality, and the creation of panaceas able to cure any disease. | The decline of European alchemy was brought about by the rise of modern science with its emphasis on rigorous quantitative experimentation. Alchemy was pushed aside by chemistry by the middle of the 18th century. | Debunk | 3 | 20 | Painting of an alchemist performing an experiment |
| Alewife | An alewife, also brewess or brewster, was a woman who brewed, and often also sold, ale as a trade. The word alewife is first recorded in England in c. 1400. Women have been active in brewing since ancient times. | In medieval times men entered the brewing trade previously dominated by women. Unlike women, men had the legal, capital, social, and cultural resources to command a quickly commercializing industry. | Social | -70 | 17 | Engraving of an alewife serving beer |
| Alnager | An alnager was an official responsible for the inspection of the shape and quality of manufactured woolen cloth. Their duty was to measure each piece of cloth, and to affix a stamp to show that it was of the necessary size and quality. | Some alnagers collected their fees without carrying out their inspections, and some accepted bribes to pass inferior cloth. The alnage system was eventually abolished for being corrupt and ineffective. | Legal | 12 | 18 | Fabric with an alnage seal |
| Armourer (chain mail) | Armourers constructed chain mail by riveting together iron or steel rings. Chain mail was more flexible and less tailored to an individual than the later plate armour. | For the wealthy, plate armour was preferred to chain mail as it provided better protection, however chain mail continued to be used by other soldiers until modern firearms rendered it ineffective in preventing serious injury. | Tech | -3 | 17 | refer to caption |
| Armourer (plate armour) | Armourers constructed a suit of armour by fitting armour to the individual wearer like a tailor. A full suit of high quality fitted armour was very expensive and restricted their clientele exclusively to the wealthy. | The development of the arquebus in the 15th century and the musket in the 16th century, which were able to penetrate plate armour, rendered the occupation of plate armourer obsolete. | Tech | 14 | 17 | Armourer's workshop |
| Ash burner | The ash burner burnt wood for industrial purposes. From the ashes, the potash needed in dyeing, in soapmaking and in glassmaking could be made by leaching and boiling. | The occupation declined with potash being increasingly made in chemical works. Potash as an industrial raw material was progressively replaced by potassium minerals obtained by mining. | Tech/Econom | -25 | 19 | Campfire with ashes |
| Baby farmer | Baby farming was accepting custody of a child in exchange for payment. For unscrupulous practitioners, it was more profitable if the child quickly died so that the process could be repeated. | The practice was controversial and quickly fell into disrepute because of sensational court cases. It was eliminated by the passage of laws regulating the child-care industry. | Legal | 18 | 19 | Three newspaper images of baby farming |
| Between maid | A between maid (or 'tweeny') combined the duties of a housemaid with those of a kitchen maid. She was the most junior member of staff and did all of the least desirable jobs. | The between maid was paid the least of all the domestic staff. The reduction in domestic staff, and the availability of better paid and more desirable employment, ended the occupation. | Econom | 14 | 20 | Room interior with dining table |
| Body snatcher | Body snatchers, also known as resurrectionists, illicitly removed corpses from burial sites for subsequent sale to, for example, anatomy schools. | Legal changes, (Note: For example, the Anatomy Act 1832 in the United Kingdom.) and embalming, which was in regular use by the 1880s and which enabled medical schools to keep bodies for months, led to the demise of body snatching. | Legal | 14 | 19 | Body snatchers in a cemetery |
| Breaker boy | A breaker boy was a coal-mining worker who separated impurities from coal by hand in a coal breaker. The job was hazardous and exhausting. | A combination of child labour laws, and technological innovations in coal purification, lessened the demand for breaker boys, but the practice did not end until the early 1920s. | Child | 19 | 20 | refer to caption |
| Brush maker | A brush maker manufactured brushes, brooms, and mops. Another term for a broom maker was a broomsquire. | Mechanisation during the Industrial Revolution eventually made it uneconomic to manufacture brushes and brooms outside of a factory. The vacuum cleaner also provided competition. | Tech | -35 | 20 | Engraving of brush-maker's workshop |
| Buckle-maker | Buckle-makers made metal buckles for shoes, harnesses, saddles and other uses. | Separate buckles remained fashionable until they were abandoned in the years after the French Revolution. | Cultur | 17 | 19 | Advertisement card for a buckle-maker |
| Burlak | A burlak was a riverboat or barge hauler in the Russian Empire. It was a seasonal occupation. The occupation also existed in other European countries. | With the proliferation of steamships the demand for burlaks diminished and they basically disappeared by the end of the 19th century. | Tech | 16 | 20 | Painting of Russian burlaks |
| Cavalryman | A cavalryman was a soldier who fought mounted on horseback. Until the 20th century, cavalry were the most mobile of the combat arms. | The first engagements of World War I showed that cavalry were ineffective against modern infantry and artillery. During the 20th century nearly all cavalry, apart from ceremonial units, were phased out or mechanized. | Tech | -15 | 20 | Mounted cavalryman with lance |
| Cat's meat man | The cat's meat man (or woman) sold meat, frequently horse meat, for cats and dogs from a hand-cart. The occupation was a type of hawker. | In the late 19th century commercial cat and dog food became available and this gradually displaced horse meat as the normal diet for pets. | Tech | 19 | 20 | Street scene with a cat begging for food from a vendor |
| Climbing boy | Climbing boys (or girls) were chimney sweeps' apprentices. Being small they could get into spaces too restricted for adults to fit into. The job was arduous and dangerous. | The occupation was controversial because it exposed children to multiple risks. Progressive legal restrictions eliminated the practice by the end of the 19th century. (Note: In the United Kingdom the following laws progressively restricted the employment of climbing boys: Chimney Sweepers Act 1788, Chimney Sweepers Act 1834, Chimney Sweepers and Chimneys Regulation Act 1840, Chimney Sweepers Regulation Act 1864 and Chimney Sweepers Act 1875) | Child | 17 | 19 | Chimney sweep and a climbing boy |
| Coach-maker | A coach-maker was a person who constructed horse-drawn passenger-carrying vehicles. Typically the wheels for the coach or carriage were made separately by a wheelwright. | When horse-drawn coaches were superseded by motorized vehicles, and handmade motor coachwork gave way to mass-produced vehicles, the number of coach-makers diminished significantly. | Tech | 14 | 20 | Engraving of a coach-maker in his workshop |
| Coachman | A coachman was an employee who drove a coach or carriage, a horse-drawn vehicle designed for the conveyance of passengers. A coachman could be assisted by a footman or a postilion. | In the 20th century cars and buses replaced horse-drawn coaches making the occupation of coachman obsolete except for ceremonial and tourist purposes. | Tech | 14 | 20 | Two coaches outside a public house |
| Colporter | A colporter was a travelling salesman in publications, books, and religious tracts. In 1856, the American Tract Society had 547 colporteurs working full-time. | The wider availability of publications during the late 19th century made the personal, overland delivery and sale of printed literature uneconomic. | Econom | 16 | 20 | Peddler and boy on horseback |
| Computer | A (human) computer performed calculations for mathematical tables, in astronomy, in weather forecasting and other fields. Some human computers transitioned to being programmers. | As calculators, and later (machine) computers, became more prevalent, (human) computers were replaced because they were slower, more expensive, and more prone to error. | Tech | 17 | 20 | Female worker writing a calculation on a wall-board |
| Cooper | A cooper was a craftsman who produced wooden casks, barrels, and other similar containers from timber staves. | The demand for wooden beer barrels fell after the 1940s, when they were replaced by metal drums and glass bottles. This led to a great decline in the need for coopers. | Tech | -26 | 20 | Cooper working on the inside of a barrel |
| Cork-cutter | A cork-cutter cut bottle corks (and other items such as flotation devices) from sheets of cork. | In the middle of the 19th century, mechanization of the cork-cutting process rendered individual cork-cutting uneconomic. | Tech | 17 | 19 | Engraving of cork-cutter's workshop |
| Crossing sweeper | A crossing sweeper was a street sweeper who swept a path ahead of people crossing dirty urban streets in exchange for a gratuity. | Attitudes to crossing sweepers were mixed. A combination of street sweeping, buses and the replacement of horses by motor vehicles made the occupation uneconomic. | Social | 19 | 20 | Painting of a crossing sweeper boy with a lady client |
| Doffer | A doffer, often a child, replaced full bobbins in textile mills. The job was noisy, dangerous and often led to respiratory diseases. | In the United States the practice of employing children ended in 1933. In modern mills doffing machines have replaced humans. | Child | 18 | 20 | Adolescent girl doffer in a cotton mill |
| Dog whipper | A dog whipper was a church official who removed unruly dogs from church grounds during services. They were most prominent in areas of England and continental Europe. | As bringing dogs to religious services became less acceptable, and with the later advent of animal shelters, the occupation of dog whipper became obsolete. | Social | 16 | 19 | Portrait of a dog whipper sitting in a church |
| Drummer (military) | A drummer was responsible for the military drums used on the battlefield. Drums, often accompanied by fifers, were used for troops marching in step, and to signal commands from officers to troops. | In 1914 drums were still in use by the Austro-Hungarian army. The unsuitability of drums for modern warfare was quickly realised and in September 1914 the drums were withdrawn, and the drummers transferred to other duties. | Child | 13 (Note: In early medieval Europe (5th to 10th century), the Byzantine Empire made use of military drums to indicate marching and rowing cadence. Pryor, John H.; Jeffries, Elizabeth M. (2006). The Age of the ΔΡΟΜΩΝ: The Byzantine Navy ca 500–1204. Brill. ISBN 978-9-04740-993-9.) | 20 | Painting of an English drummer boy |
| Drysalter | A drysalter was a dealer in chemical products that were used in other local occupations, especially the dyeing of cloth. They might also have sold pickles, dried meat or related items. | As local manufacturing businesses consolidated into larger regional factories, the need for local supply by drysalters declined, leading to the occupation becoming obsolete. | Econom | 18 | 20 | Plaque commemorating the site of a drysalting business |
| Elevator operator | An elevator operator ran a manually operated elevator. Elevator operators still work in some historic or specialist installations and fill modern niches, such as in luxury hotels and Japanese department stores. | The introduction of automated elevators combined with operator strikes led to the almost complete elimination of elevator operators. | Tech | 19 | 20 | Female operator at an elevator door |
| Elocutionist | An elocutionist was a speaker, entertainer, and teacher of elocution. The elocutionist's performances featured the reading of passages from literature with accompanying gestures. | Elocutionists started to fall into disrepute at the end of the 19th century. Elocution declined because of changing public tastes, a new academic approach to speech, and doubtful practices of less skillful readers and "entertainers". | Cultur | 18 | 20 | Drawing of elocutionist speaking to two boys |
| Escheator | The escheator was the official responsible for enforcing the rights of the Crown as feudal lord. The escheator would claim and administer real property if a person died intestate or committed a felony. | The escheator's inquisition process was vulnerable to malpractice, and they were suspected of sometimes defrauding the Crown by returning inaccurate valuations or revenues. The Tenures Abolition Act 1660 ended feudal land tenure. | Legal | 12 | 17 | Coat of arms of an English escheator |
| Expressman | An expressman packed, managed, and ensured delivery of a valuable cargo. An expressman travelled on horseback, by stagecoach, and later by train. | Government postal workers, and eventually parcel workers, took over the management of mail and packages in the early 20th century replacing expressmen. | Econom | 19 | 20 | Engraving of an expressman on horseback |
| Fifer | A fifer was a non-combatant foot soldier who originally played the fife during combat. The fifer sounded signals and also kept time during marches with the drummers. Fifers were often boys too young to fight. | The concept of unarmed children on the battlefield became unacceptable in the 19th century, leading to the occupation of fifer becoming obsolete. | Child | 18 | 19 | Painting of a boy fifer |
| Footman | A footman was a male domestic worker employed to wait at table and to ride on or run beside his employer's coach or carriage to provide security and assistance with baggage. A footman could perform other duties, such as being a guest's valet, as directed by the butler. | Footmen were something of a luxury as they performed a less essential role than the cook, maid or butler. Once a common position in great houses, the footman became much rarer after World War I as fewer households could afford a large staff. The role of footman is now largely a historic one. | Econom | 14 | 20 | Drawing of a footman with a serving dish |
| Fuller | A fuller cleansed and thickened wool using their hands and feet. In the Middle Ages water-powered fulling mills were introduced to replace manual fulling. | Manual and mechanical fulling co-existed from the 10th to the 20th centuries, with manual fulling gradually replaced by the fulling mill. | Tech | -8 (Note: Book of Isaiah 7:3 King James Version: "Then said the LORD unto Isaiah, Go forth now to meet Ahaz, thou, and Shearjashub thy son, at the end of the conduit of the upper pool in the highway of the fuller's field." Wischnitzer, Mark (1965). A history of Jewish crafts and guilds. New York: Jonathan David. p. 11.) | 20 | Engraving of ten women fulling cloth with their feet |
| Garden hermit | A garden hermit was an employee dwelling alone in a small building on the estate of a landowner. The hermit would be contracted to remain on site for a long period, and would be cared for, consulted for advice, or viewed for entertainment. | Keeping a garden hermit had practical problems for both the employer and the employee, and went out of fashion in the middle of the 19th century. | Cultur | 18 | 19 | Hermit at the door of his dwelling |
| Gladiator | A gladiator was an armed combatant who entertained audiences in the Roman Republic and Roman Empire in violent confrontations with other gladiators, wild animals, and condemned criminals. | Gladiatorial games were gradually phased out because of their high cost and because they were disapproved of by prominent Christians like Augustine of Hippo. | Cultur | -3 | 5 | Mosaic with fighting gladiators |
| Gong farmer | A gong farmer, also known as a nightman, dug out and removed human excrement (night soil) from privies and cesspits. (Note: Gong farmer is included under the name "Nightman" in the occupational categories "Dust Collector", "Scavenger" in the UK censuses for 1841, 1851 and 1861. The occupation of scavenger is still current in India, Bangladesh and Pakistan.) | Modern sewage disposal systems largely eliminated the occupation by the end of the 19th century. Emptying cesspits is now usually carried out by vacuum trucks. | Tech | 9 | 20 | Woman with two buckets of night-soil |
| Hall boy | The hall boy was the most junior male member of staff and was assigned the dirtiest and heaviest jobs. He usually slept in the servants' hall. His female equivalents were the between maid and the scullery maid. | Long hours, poor pay and conditions, and better employment opportunities outside domestic service combined to eliminate this occupation. | Econom | 14 | 20 | Interior with dining table |
| Ice cutter | An ice cutter collected surface ice from lakes and rivers during the Winter for storage in an ice house. The ice was later delivered to customers by an iceman. | The era of widespread refrigeration and air conditioning technology, together with consumer concerns about impure ice, largely put an end to the ice trade. | Tech | 17 | 20 | Newspaper page depicting stages in ice cutting |
| Iceman | An iceman sold or delivered ice from a wagon, cart, or motor-truck. In the Winter many icemen were employed as ice cutters. | The introduction of the electrical refrigerator allowed customers to make and store their own ice, so that delivery by an iceman was no longer economic. | Tech | 17 | 20 | Deliveryman with a large ice block on his shoulder |
| Illuminator of manuscripts | An illuminator of manuscripts, sometimes called a limner, created copies of books and manuscripts by lettering and illuminating the text. In the early period the illuminator normally mixed their own pigments. | With the invention of the printing press, copies of books could be produced more quickly and less expensively than those produced by the scribe and illuminator. This technological change led to the occupation becoming obsolete. | Tech | -19 | 16 | Mural of book illuminator |
| Ivory carver | Ivory carvers carved animal teeth or tusks with sharp cutting tools to produce decorative objects. | As ivory-producing species have become endangered through hunting, legislation has reduced the availability of ivory and hence the demand for ivory carvers. | Envir | -99 | 20 | Photograph of two Japanese ivory carvers |
| Keypunch operator | Keypunch operators keyed data or programs onto physical media, for example punched cards, so that it could be read by machines, for example computers. | Keypunch operators were made obsolete by data entry systems which allowed data and program originators to enter it directly instead of writing it on forms to be entered by keypunch operators. | Tech | 19 | 20 | Two female keypunch operators |
| Kitchen maid | The kitchen maid assisted the cook with the preparation of meals and was responsible for numerous cleaning tasks. In houses with large domestic staffs she was assisted by the scullery maid. | Attitudes to domestic work changed in the late 19th century as other employment opportunities arose. As domestic staffs shrank, the cook would often be retained at the expense of the kitchen maid. | Econom | 14 | 20 | Painting of a kitchen maid peeling root vegetables |
| Knocker-up | A knocker-up's job was to rouse sleeping people so they could get to work on time. A knocker-up was often employed to wake up workers on shifts, particularly in factory areas, but was also sometimes self-employed. | As alarm clocks became less expensive and more reliable, there was no longer a need to pay a knocker-up. | Tech | 18 | 20 | Man waking people by knocking on a bedroom window with a long pole |
| Lady's companion | A lady's companion was a woman of genteel birth who lived with a woman of rank or wealth. A lady's companion usually took up the occupation in order to earn a living and have somewhere to live. | The occupation of lady's companion became obsolete because upper-class women no longer primarily stayed in the home, and also because of the many other employment opportunities open to modern women. | Cultur | 18 | 20 | Etching of two elegantly dressed ladies |
| Lamplighter | Lamplighters toured public streets at dusk, lighting outdoor fixtures by means of a wick on a long pole. At dawn, the lamplighter would return to extinguish the lights using a small hook on the same pole. | Electric street lighting, which does not require lamplighters, replaced candles and oil and gas lamps. Additionally, gas lighting is more expensive than electric lighting. | Tech | 16 | 20 | Street scene depicting two lamplighters |
| Lector | A lector reads books or newspapers aloud to factory workers. | The lector tradition ended in the aftermath of the Ybor City cigar makers' strike of 1931 | Social | 19 | 20 | A lector reader, Tampa January 1909 |
| Leech collector | A leech collector procured medicinal leeches, which were in demand by medical practitioners for bloodletting. Leech collecting was an unpleasant and poorly paid occupation. | Leeches were promoted by François Broussais and other physicians. After Broussais died in 1838 the enthusiasm for leeches rapidly faded away, leading to a drop in the demand for leeches, and the employment of collectors. | Debunk | 18 | 20 | Three women collecting leeches in a pond |
| Legger | A legger used his legs to move a boat through a canal tunnel or adit without a towpath. The occupation was arduous and sometimes dangerous. | Originally canal boats were horse-drawn. After boats were fitted with motors there was no longer any requirement for legging through tunnels. | Tech | 18 | 19 | Demonstration of the process of legging through a tunnel |
| Limeburner | Limeburners loaded, fired, cooled and unloaded a lime kiln in a one-week cycle. The work was physically strenuous and somewhat dangerous as the end-product (lime or CaO) is caustic. Lime was used as a building material. | Local small-scale kilns became increasingly unprofitable, and they gradually died out through the 19th century. They were replaced by larger industrial plants with more efficient kilns. | Tech | -7 | 20 | Limeburner constructing a lime kiln |
| Link-boy | A link-boy carried a flaming torch to light the way for pedestrians at night. Linkboys were common in London in the days before street lighting. | The introduction of gas lighting in the 19th century rendered the occupation of link-boy obsolete. | Tech | 15 | 19 | refer to caption |
| Man-at-arms | A man-at-arms was a soldier, well-versed in the use of arms, who served as a fully-armoured heavy cavalryman. The term man-at-arms denoted a military function, rather than a social rank. | By the 16th century men-at-arms carrying the lance were displaced by lightly armoured, or later unarmoured, soldiers employing firearms and a sword. | Tech | 11 | 16 | Mounted man in a suit of armour with a lance |
| Matchgirl | A matchgirl was a street vendor of matches. As matches were an inexpensive product, with little profit margin, they were often sold by children. (Note: The occupation was drawn to the world's attention by the story The Little Match Girl written by Hans Christian Andersen, first published in 1845.) | In common with other child labour occupations, laws progressively banned work by children and redirected them into compulsory education. | Child | 17 | 20 | Young girl offering a box of matches for sale |
| Match maker | A match maker (not to be confused with matchmaking) was a worker in match manufacturing. The occupation was badly paid and also unsafe because of exposure to white phosphorus leading to phosphorus necrosis of the jaw. | Initially, matches and matchboxes were produced locally on a small scale. The industry progressively became industrialized, and following a match workers' strike and greater automation, there was a decline in employment of match makers. | Tech | 5 | 20 | Women working in a match factory |
| Mudlark | A mudlark was someone who scavenged the banks of rivers for items of value. The occupation was adopted by people, often children, in poverty and with a lack of skills. Work conditions were filthy and uncomfortable. | Although in 1904 a person could still claim "mudlark" as an occupation, by then it seems to have been no longer viewed as an acceptable or lawful pursuit. Mudlarking today is more of a hobby than an occupation. | Legal | 18 | 20 | Man searching for objects of value in the water |
| Mule scavenger | Scavengers were employed in cotton mills to clear the area underneath a spinning mule. The cotton wastage was seen as too valuable for the owners to leave, thus they employed young children to work under the machinery. | The Sadler report exposed the poor working conditions in factories for children, including mule scavengers. The occupation was recognised as dangerous for child workers and became obsolete. | Child | 18 | 20 | Boy with a brush under a cotton spinning machine |
| Mute | A mute, who could be a child or an adult, was a paid mourner at funerals. The mute would wear sombre clothing including a black cloak, a top hat with trailing hatbands, and gloves. Adult mutes had an unfortunate reputation for drunkenness. | Child mutes were present at some Victorian funerals, as described in Dickens's Oliver Twist and Martin Chuzzlewit, but have since fallen out of fashion. Other types of professional mourners are still employed in some Asian countries. | Cultur | 17 | 20 | Boy dressed as a funeral mute |
| Needle maker | The needle maker took the product of the wire-drawer to manufacture metal needles in a multi-step process. Needle making was a toxic and risky occupation. | The demand for needles increased greatly in the 19th century. Increased production and lower unit costs were achieved in highly mechanised factories which replaced human needle makers. | Tech | -2 (Note: Refers to needles made from metal wire. See Ancient sewing needles) | 20 | Engraving showing the eight steps in needle manufacturing |
| Ninja | A ninja was an infiltration agent, mercenary, or guerrilla warfare fighter, and later bodyguard in feudal Japan. A ninja's activities included espionage, reconnaissance, ambush, and agitprop. | Following the Tokugawa shogunate in the 17th century, the ninja faded into practical obscurity. | Legal | 12 | 18 | Ninja in black clothes climbing a rope |
| Oakum picker | Oakum, a preparation of hemp or jute used to seal gaps, was recycled from old tarry ropes, which were unravelled and reduced to fibre. This was a common occupation in prisons and workhouses, where inmates who could not do heavy labour were put to work picking oakum. (Note: Although most oakum was picked in institutions, it was also done as a task onboard ships, and there was an oakum picking cottage industry. Wilson, Ivy G. (June 2011). "The Spectacle of Disorder: Race, Decoration, and the Social Logic of Space". Specters of Democracy: Blackness and the Aesthetics of Politics in the Antebellum (Online ed.). pp. 126–144. doi:10.1093/acprof:oso/9780195337372.003.0007.) | The Poor Relief Act 1601 had provided for a "convenient stock of Flax, Hemp ... to set the poor on work". The activity became uneconomic as free workhouse labour was phased out and the cost of paid labour exceeded the value of the recycled material. | Legal | 16 | 19 | Prisoners picking oakum |
| Phrenologist | A phrenologist purported to measure bumps on the skull to predict mental traits. This was a rare occupation: for example, there were only 27 phrenologists in England and Wales listed in the 1861 UK census. | Phrenology has now been debunked as pseudoscience. The central phrenological notion that measuring the contour of the skull can predict personality traits has been discredited by empirical research. | Debunk | 18 | 20 | A boy having his head examined by a phrenologist |
| Physiognomist | A physiognomist purported to assess a person's character or personality from their facial appearance. Physiognomy as a practice meets the contemporary definition of pseudoscience. | Physiognomy was not a scientific discipline and, like phrenology, it fell into disrepute in the 19th century. | Debunk | -6 | 19 | Three views of an eagle's head and a man's head in similar poses |
| Pin boy | Pin boys were boys or young men hired at bowling alleys to manually reset pins and return balls to the player. | Replacing pin boys with automatic pinsetting machinery allowed bowling alleys to operate 24 hours a day, 365 days a year. | Tech | 19 | 20 | Boys setting up pins in a bowling alley |
| Pin maker | The development of the pin closely paralleled that of the needle. Pin makers used a multi-step process to make pins. | The efficiency gains from mechanisation of pin manufacturing put the majority of manual pin makers out of work by the end of the 19th century. (Note: Pin manufacturing in England and Wales showed a progressive decrease in employment from 1841-1871 according to the decennial census figures. However, the figures should be treated with caution as occupations were self-declared, and changing demand could affect the figures irrespective of developments in manufacturing processes. Pin Manufacture Workers, England and Wales, 1841-1871 1841: 1330 "1841 Census of Great Britain, Occupations". 1851: 1295 "Census of 1851 – Occupations". 1861: 729 "Census of 1861 – Occupations – England and Wales". 1871: 687 Census Office, Great Britain (1970) [1873]. 1871 census, England and Wales; ages, civil condition, occupations and birthplaces. Irish U.P. pp. xl, xlv. ISBN 978-0-71651-195-3.) | Tech | -2 | 19 | Six people in a pin workshop |
| Plague doctor | A plague doctor was a physician who treated victims of bubonic plague during epidemics. They were hired by cities to treat infected patients, especially the poor. | As the occupation was unpleasant and dangerous, the physicians appointed as plague doctors tended to be inexperienced and second-rate. As the plague receded the need for plague doctors fell. | Envir | 14 | 17 | Engraving of a plague doctor wearing a beaked mask |
| Postilion | A postilion was a person who guided a horse-drawn coach (or other wheeled vehicle such as a gun carriage) while mounted on a horse. By contrast, a coachman controls the horses from the vehicle itself. | As horse-drawn vehicles were replaced by motorized vehicles in the first half of the 20th century the need for postilions was eliminated. A few postilions are still used at occasions of ceremonial importance. | Tech | 14 | 20 | Painting of three postillions and six horses pulling an artillery piece |
| Poundmaster | A poundmaster (or pinder) was a local government official responsible for the care of stray livestock. This was a common occupation in colonial America. | Since the need to deal with stray livestock today is now rare, the function has evolved into the modern dog-catcher or animal control officer. Stray pets are sent to animal shelters. | Social | 18 | 19 | Man lassooing a stray dog to be put into the dog catcher's horse-drawn vehicle |
| Powder monkey | A powder monkey manned naval guns as a member of a warship's crew, primarily during the Age of Sail. His chief role was to ferry gunpowder from the powder magazine in the ship's hold to the artillery pieces. | Developments in naval gunnery, and the phasing out of child labour during the 19th century, eliminated the position of powder boy. | Child | 17 | 19 | Team of six sailors firing a nautical gun |
| Priest hunter | A priest hunter spied on or captured Catholic priests during Penal Times in the British Isles. Priest hunters were effectively bounty hunters. | Catholic emancipation brought the persecution of Catholics to an end. The Roman Catholic Relief Act 1829 finally eliminated the bounty for catching priests. | Legal | 16 | 19 | Plaque on a church wall commemorating Catholic martyrs |
| Printer's devil | A printer's devil was a young apprentice in a printing establishment who performed a number of tasks, such as mixing tubs of ink for the pressman and fetching type for the compositor. | By 1894, with the decline of the apprenticeship system in the printing trade, the term printer's devil was becoming obsolete. | Social | 17 | 19 | refer to caption |
| Privateer | A privateer was a private person (or vessel) who engaged in maritime warfare under a commission of war. In 1243, Henry III issued the first privateer commissions, which provided that the king would receive half the proceeds. | The 1856 Declaration of Paris outlawed privateering. During the American Civil War the Confederacy issued letters of marque to attack Union shipping or run the blockade. Privateering was obsolete by 1899. | Legal | 13 | 19 | Privateers physically searching women for their valuables |
| Punkah wallah | In India and other tropical colonial countries the punkahwallah was the servant who operated the punkah (fan), often using a pulley system. | The end of colonialism and the invention of the electric fan largely put punkah wallahs out of business in the 20th century. | Tech | 17 | 20 | Photograph of man working a punkah rope with his foot |
| Reeve | A reeve was an official elected annually by the serfs to supervise lands for a feudal lord. H. R. Loyn observed, "he [the reeve] is the earliest English specialist in estate management." | With the decline of the feudal system, and the subversion of its courts by the introduction of justices of the peace (magistrates), the use of reeves fell out of practice. | Legal | 7 | 15 | Reeve on horseback |
| Resident minister | A resident minister was a government official who took up permanent residence in another country. While in theory they were diplomats, in practice some residents exercised a degree of indirect rule. | With the end of colonialism in the 20th century, the resident minister system came to an end, and was replaced by country-to-country diplomatic relations. | Legal | 18 | 20 | Two European resident ministers bowing to the emperor of Japan |
| Resin worker | Resin workers' work involved the extraction or working of resin, which was needed as a raw material in the manufacture of pitch, tar and turpentine. | Resin worker was an occupation that largely died out in the 20th century, due to increasing labour costs, and competition from the petrochemical industry. | Tech | 16 | 20 | Man on a ladder stripping bark from a tree |
| Riding officer | A riding officer patrolled the coast to suppress smuggling. The occupation was uncomfortable, poorly-paid, dangerous, and unpopular with the local people who often supported the smugglers. | Riding officers proved to be ineffective at suppressing smuggling. With the reduction in import taxes smuggling declined, and riding officers were phased out in the early 19th century. | Legal | 17 | 19 | Smugglers burying a customs officer |
| Saltpetre worker | A saltpetre worker produced potassium nitrate, an essential ingredient in gunpowder, by extraction from soil rich in dung and urine. | The arduous and expensive process of the saltpeter worker was rendered uneconomic by cheaper imports from India. | Econom | 13 | 18 | Exterior view of a saltpetre works |
| Samurai | Samurai were members of the warrior class who served as retainers to lords in Japan. Originally provincial warriors, they eventually came to play a major political role until their abolition during the Meiji era. | As the modern army emerged, the samurai were rendered increasingly obsolete and expensive to maintain. In 1877, the national army's victory over the rebellion by Saigō Takamori ended the era of the samurai. | Legal | 10 | 19 | Illustration of a samurai climbing |
| Sawyer | A sawyer sawed wood using a pitsaw, either in a saw pit, or with a log on trestles above ground. | The sawyer cut lumber to length for the building market (now done more efficiently in a sawmill), and for the consumer market (now often done in a home improvement store). | Tech | 18 | 20 | Engraving of sawyers at the two ends of a pit saw |
| Scribe | A scribe was a person who served as a professional copyist, especially one who made copies of manuscripts before the invention of mechanical printing. | Scribes have generally been displaced by photocopiers and printers. An exception is the sofer, a Jewish religious scribe. | Tech | -3 | 20 | Three scribes sitting cross-legged |
| Scrivener | A scrivener (or scribe) wrote (or copied) letters and formal documents. They also carried out secretarial and administrative duties such as dictation and keeping records. | With the advent of compulsory education, the general population learned to read and write and the need for scriveners faded away. Scriveners later developed into notaries and court reporters. | Social | -3 | 20 | Drawing of male scrivener with female client |
| Scullery maid | The scullery maid was the lowest in the hierarchy of female servants. She was assigned tasks by the cook and the kitchen maid. | Scullery maids worked long hours and were poorly paid. Other more favourable employment opportunities caused them to leave the occupation. | Econom | 14 | 20 | Painting of scullery maid with kitchen pans |
| Sedan chair bearer | Chair bearers, or chairmen, were a form of human-powered transport using a litter such as a sedan chair or a palanquin. | Improvements in paving, street lighting, and public transportation led to a progressive decline in the use of sedan chairs in the 19th century. | Social | -8 | 19 | Client inside a sedan chair carried by two bearers |
| Seneschal | The most common meaning of seneschal was a steward in a royal or noble household during the Middle Ages and early Modern period. | The office of seneschal declined in importance over the 16th and 17th centuries, but was not eliminated until the French Revolution. | Legal | 12 | 18 | Side view portrait of a French seneschal |
| Slave catcher | A slave catcher (or slave hunter) was a person employed to track down and return escaped slaves to their enslavers in the USA, Brazil or in the Caribbean. | Slave catching in the United States ceased with the ratification of the Thirteenth Amendment in 1865. Slavery was abolished in British colonies in 1838, in French colonies in 1848, and in Brazil in 1888. | Legal | 16 | 19 | Mounted slave catcher with captured slave on foot |
| Soda jerk | A soda jerk was an American term for a person—typically a young man—who would operate the soda fountain in a drugstore, preparing and serving soda drinks and ice cream sodas. | Soda jerks were relatively common in the United States from the 1920s until the late 1950s; due to economic and social trends, the occupation essentially no longer exists. | Cultur | 20 | 20 | Soda jerk offering an ice cream soda in a glass |
| Still room maid | The still room maid was a middle-ranking female servant who worked in the still room making foodstuffs, candles, and home remedies. She also prepared and served afternoon tea. | Still room maids were only employed in houses with large staffs. As specialists, they were amongst the first to go as employers downsized to the essentials of butler, housekeeper and cook. | Econom | 14 | 20 | Maid serving tea to a seated woman |
| Stocking weaver | A stocking weaver made stockings using silk, wool, linen or cotton and was paid on the basis of piece work. Stocking weaving machines started to be used in the 16th century. | Stockings made inexpensively in factories from artificial fabrics (rayon in the 1920s, then nylon in the 1940s) have eliminated the occupation of stocking weaver. | Tech | 16 | 20 | Engraving of a stocking weaver sitting at a loom |
| Sutler | A sutler was a merchant who provisioned an army in the field or camp. A vivandière had a similar function; both were types of camp followers. | Sutlers were not popular figures being profit-oriented rather than heroic. The occupation of sutler to the US army came to an end in 1893. | Legal | -5 | 20 | Photograph of a sutler's tent with clients |
| Switchboard operator | A switchboard operator connected calls by inserting a pair of phone plugs into the appropriate jacks on a manual telephone switchboard. | Switchboard operators were gradually phased out and replaced by automated systems, first those allowing direct dialing within a local area, then those for long-distance and international direct dialing. | Tech | 19 | 20 | Photograph of operators at a large telephone switchboard |
| Tallow chandler | A tallow chandler made and sold tallow candles, which were a less expensive, but lower quality, alternative to wax candles. | Tallow candles were replaced first by wax candles and then by gas and electric lighting. | Tech | 13 | 20 | Engraving of a tallow chandler making candles |
| Telegraph operator | A telegraph operator used telegraphy to send and receive messages over long distances. A variety of methods have been employed, such as optical, electrical, wireless (or radio), and reflected sunlight. | Competition from the telephone, which had a speed advantage, drove the telegraph into decline from 1920 onwards. The few remaining telegraph applications were largely taken over by alternatives on the internet towards the end of the 20th century. | Tech | 18 | 20 | Telegraph operating using a morse key |
| Thief-taker | A thief-taker was hired by a crime victim to bring criminals to justice. Thief-takers, such as Jonathan Wild, had a corrupt reputation sometimes colluding with the criminals they were meant to catch. | Thief-takers usually worked in pairs or groups as it was a risky occupation. Thief-takers existed until the mid-19th century when they were replaced by professional police forces. | Legal | 17 | 19 | refer to caption |
| Tondenhei | Tondenhei were military settler colonists recruited to develop and defend Japan's northern frontier in Hokkaidō and Karafuto against foreign states, particularly Imperial Russia. | After the Kaitakushi was abolished in 1882, the Imperial Japanese Army assumed control of the units. In 1903 they incorporated them into the 7th "Bear" Division. | Legal | 19 | 20 | Tondenhei farmers working in the fields |
| Tosher | A tosher, or sewer-hunter, scavenged in the sewers especially in London during the Victorian era. | The occupation was dangerous, unpleasant, illegal and unpopular. Modernisation of the sewerage system helped to eliminate the occupation. | Tech | 19 | 20 | Man in a sewer tunnel panning for valuable objects |
| Town crier | A town crier was an officer of a royal court or public authority who made public announcements in the streets. | Newspapers, radio, television, and the internet have displaced town criers from their function. The role is now ceremonial. | Tech | 11 | 20 | Town crier with hand bell and paper announcement |
| Water carrier | The occupation of water carrier existed before the advent of centralized water supply systems. A water carrier collected water from a source and transported it to people's homes. | The poor carried water themselves; those who could afford it paid the water carrier. After the construction of pipe networks, the profession of water carrier became obsolete. | Tech | 16 | 20 | Photograph of a male water carrier in a turban |
| Wheelwright | A wheelwright was an artisan who built or repaired spoked wooden wheels. Wheelwrights established associations to control the trade, for example the Worshipful Company of Wheelwrights. | In the United Kingdom census there were over 26,000 wheelwrights in 1841, and over 30,000 in 1871. By the early 20th century, wheelwright employment had faded away due to a lack of demand for wooden wheels. | Tech | -20 (Note: Refers to wheels with spokes rather than earlier solid wooden wheels) | 20 | Engraving of a wheelwright hammering a wooden wheel |
| Wire-drawer | A wire-drawer produced metal wires used in further manufacturing processes, such as needle making. The wire-drawer reduced the cross-section of a wire by pulling it through one or more dies. | Increasing demand for wire and the development of rolling mills using greater force and higher temperatures made the production of wire by individual wire-drawers uneconomic. | Tech | 9 | 20 | Engraving of a wire-drawer in his workshop |
| Woad dyer | A woad dyer extracted woad from the Isatis tinctoria plant and used it to dye textiles blue. The occupation required skill and experience but was unpopular due to the stench. | Imported indigo from India, which was produced more cheaply and had better tinting strength, gradually forced the woad dyers out of business. | Econom | -1 | 19 | Circular horse-drawn milling machine for woad |
| Wool comber | A wool comber cleaned and prepared wool into a state ready to be spun into worsted. The wool comber used heated metal combs to comb the wool. | The invention of the wool combing machine in the late 18th century and its progressive use in factories rendered manual wool combing inefficient. | Tech | -99 | 19 | Engraving of a wool comber in his workshop |

== See also ==
- Artisan
- Job obsolescence
- Technological unemployment
- Tradesperson
