= Peter Levene, Baron Levene of Portsoken =

British businessman

The Right Honourable The Lord Levene of Portsoken KBE KStJ JP
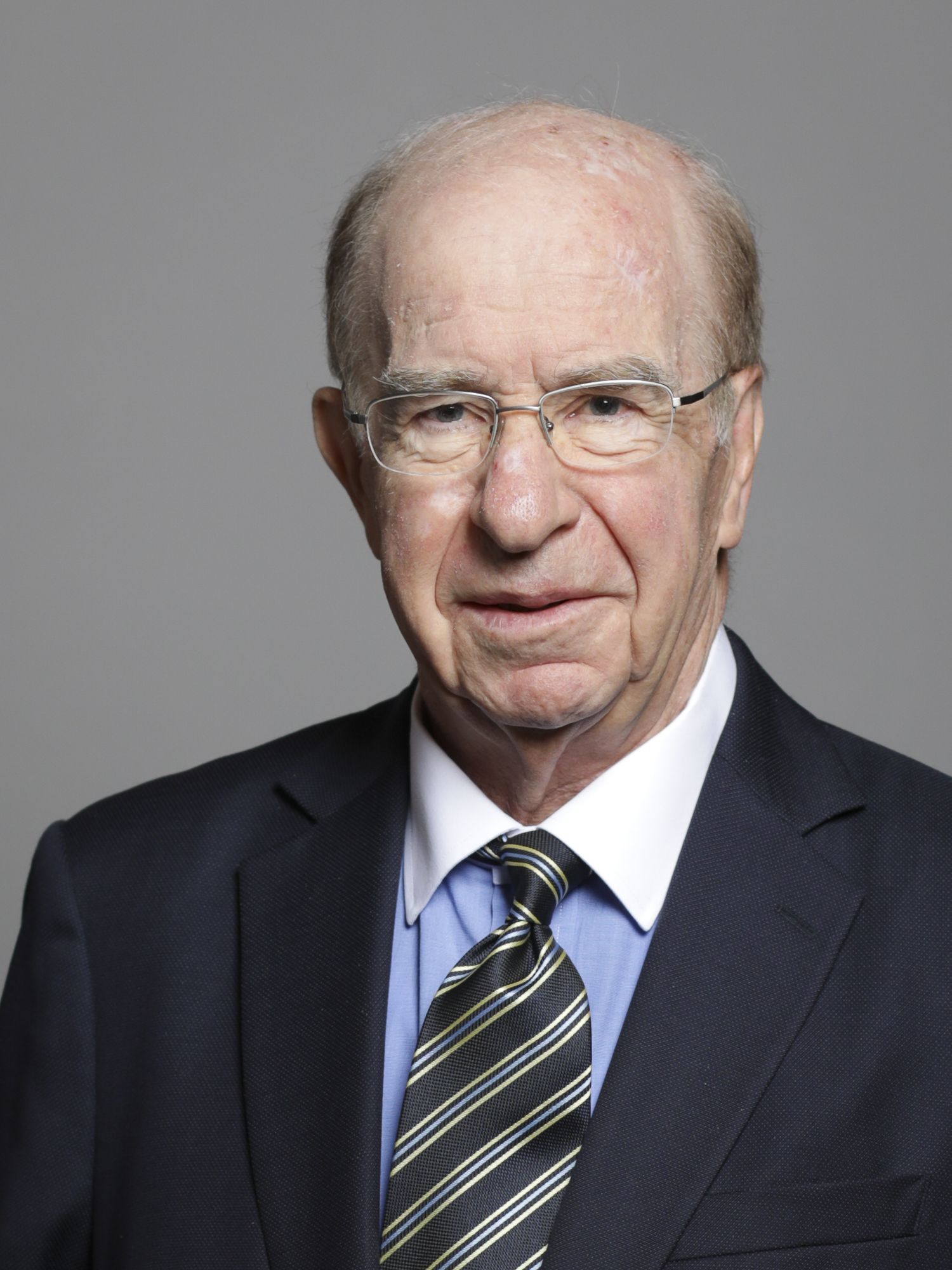
- Official portrait, 2020

671st Lord Mayor of London
- In office 1998–1999
- Preceded by: Richard Nichols
- Succeeded by: Clive Martin

Member of the House of Lords
- Lord Temporal
- Life peerage 22 July 1997 – 28 November 2024

Personal details
- Born: Peter Keith Levene; 8 December 1941 (age 84) Pinner, Middlesex, England
- Spouse: Wendy Fraiman (m. 1966)

Peter Keith Levene, Baron Levene of Portsoken (born 8 December 1941), is a British businessman who was the chairman of Lloyd's of London from 2003 to 2011 and served as Lord Mayor of London from 1998 to 1999. He was a member of the House of Lords from 1997 to 2024.

== Education ==
He was educated at the City of London School and then studied at the University of Manchester where he graduated with a degree in Economics and Political Science.

== Life ==
Lord Levene is chairman of Starr Underwriting Agents Limited. Previously, he served as chairman of the Lloyd's of London insurance and reinsurance market from 2002 to 2011, after having been vice chairman of Deutsche Bank. Prior to this, he held the position of chairman of Bankers Trust International and was formerly with both Morgan Stanley and Wasserstein Perella. He joined United Scientific Holdings in 1963, a small company which grew into a substantial supplier to UK and overseas Ministries of Defence. He eventually rose to the post of chairman of that group, in 1981.

Subsequently, he was asked by the then Secretary of State for Defence, Michael Heseltine, to act as his Personal Advisor in the MoD, and then as Permanent Secretary in the role of Chief of Defence Procurement, a position which he held for six years. As UK National Armaments Director, he was appointed as chairman of the European National Armaments Directors 1989–1990. He thereafter held a number of Government posts, as Advisor to the Secretary of State for the Environment; to the President of the Board of Trade; and to the Chancellor of the Exchequer. He was appointed as Advisor to the Prime Minister (John Major) on Efficiency and Effectiveness from 1992 to 1997, producing a report, Efficiency Scrutiny into Construction Procurement by Government. in 1996. During this period, he also served as chairman of the Docklands Light Railway and then chairman and Chief Executive of Canary Wharf Ltd. He served as a member of the Board of Directors of J Sainsbury plc from 2001 to 2004, and of Total S.A., from 2005 to 2011, and was chairman of General Dynamics UK Ltd until 2019.

He served as an Alderman of the City of London from 1994 to 2012 and as Sheriff of London from 1995 to 1996. He was Lord Mayor of London for the year 1998–99, in which role he presided over the Corporation of the City of London, and supported and promoted London as an international financial centre. He was appointed Knight Commander of the Order of the British Empire (KBE) in the 1989 New Year Honours and was created a life peer on 22 July 1997 as Baron Levene of Portsoken, of Portsoken in the City of London. He sat as a crossbencher in the House of Lords until his retirement on 28 November 2024.

During his 1998–99 term as Lord Mayor of London, Levene and his wife lit Shabbat candles in the official Mansion House residence whenever they were there on Friday evening. His first official engagement after installation was a thanksgiving service incorporated into the Friday-night service at Bevis Marks Synagogue.

Levene has held three other non-executive directorships in addition to Starr underwriting, as chairman of Tikehau Capital Europe Ltd, and on the boards of Haymarket Media Group, and China Construction Bank. He is a member of the House of Lords Finance Committee and was also a member of the Joint Committee on National Security Strategy. He was appointed by the Secretary of State for Defence in July 2010 to chair the Defence Reform Group, a body set up to review proposals for changes in structure in the UK Ministry of Defence. This body reported in June 2011 and their recommendations are now being implemented. He speaks French, German and Italian.

== Family ==
Lord Levene is married to Wendy, Lady Levene, who is active in many charities. She is a trustee of the Jewish Museum. She had polymyalgia rheumatica and is a trustee of the associated charity, PMRGCA UK. In 1989, she launched HMS Argyll, a Royal Navy warship sponsored by the Worshipful Company of Paviors. They have three children – John Levene, born 1968, Nicole Walsh, born 1969, Tim Levene – born 1973, and ten grandchildren.

== Arms ==
Coat of arms of Peter Levene, Baron Levene of Portsoken
Coronet Coronet of a Baron Crest A Mail Gauntlet clenched Argent, in front of two Vine Branches in saltire leaved and fructed proper. Escutcheon Per pale Gules and Azure, between three Swords palewise in fess the outer two with their points downwards all three Argent, their Hilts Pommels and Quillons Or, two Towers Argent, masoned proper, in front of the portal of each tower a Cartwheel Gules, and on a Chief per pale Azure and Gules, a Boar's Head couped Or, langued Gules, tusked Argent, between two Loving Cups of Silver. Supporters Dexter: a Scorpion Or, the Stinger Azure. Sinister: a Scorpion Or, the Stinger Gules. Motto INDUSTRIA ATQUE FORTUNA (By industry and fortune)

== Publications ==
- Levene, Peter – Send for Levene. Autobiography; introduction by Michael Heseltine. Published 2018 by Nine Elms Books, London. ISBN 9781910533420.

Civic offices
Preceded by Sir Richard Nichols	Lord Mayor of London; 1998–1999	Succeeded by Sir Clive Martin
Orders of precedence in the United Kingdom
Preceded by The Lord Patten	Gentlemen; Baron Levene of Portsoken	Followed by The Lord Levy
