= Cork Gully =

UK business

Cork Gully is a financial and operational restructuring advisory firm headquartered in London. The firm specialises in business transformation, restructuring and special situations, such as the management of tail-end and/or challenged funds, as a sub-advisor or successor asset manager.

The original firm Cork Gully was established as an insolvency practice, and became pre-eminent in its field from the 1960s to 1990s. In 1980, it merged with Coopers & Lybrand, later becoming part of PricewaterhouseCoopers (PwC). In 2010, the current management team bought the firm from PwC and established Cork Gully LLP, retaining the brand and its insolvency practices as an independent entity.

== Original firm ==
Cork Gully
- Type: Partnership
- Industry: Insolvency
- Predecessor: WH Cork & Co
- Founded: 1906; 120 years ago in London, England
- Founders: William Henry Cork, Kenneth Cork, and Harry Gully
- Defunct: 1999
- Fate: Merged into PwC
- Headquarters: London, England
- Key people: Sir Kenneth Cork, Roger Cork

In 1906 William Henry Cork created WH Cork & Co, focusing on grocery businesses which were, at that time, being forced out of business by the growth of multiple grocers. In 1935 William Henry Cork formed a partnership with his son Kenneth Cork, and Harry Gully, creating Cork Gully. After William Henry Cork's death and a period of wartime service, his son Kenneth Cork succeeded him as senior partner. He went on to expand the firm as a specialist insolvency practice, gaining pre-eminence in its field by the 1970s. Gerhard (Gerry) Weiss joined the firm in 1952, and was made the first insolvency partner in 1954.

Sir Kenneth Cork (as he later became known) chaired the Cork Committee, whose report issued in 1982 is widely referred to as the Cork Report which led to the passing of the Insolvency Act 1986. He also served as Lord Mayor of London in 1978–79.

Sir Kenneth's son Sir Roger Cork followed in his footsteps, both as a partner in Cork Gully and as Lord Mayor of London (1996–97).

In 1980 Sir Kenneth Cork's successor as senior partner, Michael Jordan, led the firm into a merger with Coopers & Lybrand, which continued to use the name. The Cork Gully brand was eventually discontinued in 1999 after Coopers and Lybrand itself merged with Price Waterhouse to form PwC.

The original firm's assignments included Rolls Razor, Emil Savundra, Barlow Clowes and car maker De Lorean.

== Present day ==
Cork Gully LLP
- Type: LLP
- Industry: Advisory
- Founded: 2010; 16 years ago in London, England
- Founders: Stephen Cork
- Headquarters: London, England
- Key people: Stephen Cork, Managing Partner
- Website: www.corkgully.com

In 2010 Stephen Cork, great grandson of the original founder William Henry Cork, acquired Cork Gully from PwC and established Cork Gully LLP in London. He was formerly the Head of Restructuring & Recovery at Smith & Williamson, now Evelyn Partners. The firm provides advice on business transformation, asset management, disputes, restructuring and insolvency.

Cork Gully has offices in the United Kingdom, the Channel Islands, Luxembourg, Cayman Islands and New York.

In June 2023, the firm launched an asset management division to provide support for managers and investors in challenged and tail-end funds. It also advises on and manages regulated and unregulated investment funds, either as sub-advisers or replacement managers.

== See also ==
- List of management consulting firms
- List of asset management firms
