= Robert Bassett =

Robert Bassett may refer to:

- Robert C. Bassett (1911–2000), American newspaper publisher, lawyer, and political advisor
- Robert Bassett (MP) (fl.1460), English member of parliament for City of London

== See also ==
- Robert Basset (1573–1641), English member of parliament for Plymouth
