= Ice cellar =

Ice cellar may refer to:

- Ice cellar, a food storage technology used by Alaska Natives
- Ice cellar, a room for storing ice harvested through ice cutting
