= Slave catcher (Brazil) =

People who tracked down slaves in Brazil

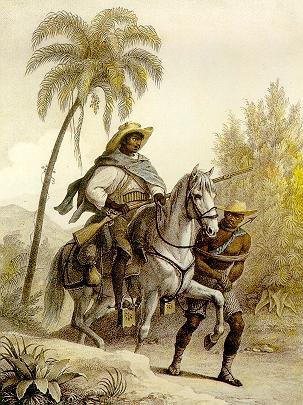
Illustration of a slave catcher by Rugendas

A slave catcher (in Portuguese: capitão do mato) was a person employed, usually a former slave, to track down and return escaped slaves to their enslavers. Slave catchers were active in Brazil, both during the period it was a Portuguese colony and after it became an independent nation. Unlike in North America, indigenous Brazilians occasionally became slave catchers as well. Escaped slaves in Brazil formed quilombos, which slave catchers frequently raided, resulting in most of them becoming abandoned or destroyed. The institution of slave catching in Brazil disappeared after the passage of the Lei Áurea by the Brazilian General Assembly in 1888, which abolished slavery in the country.

== See also ==
- Slave catcher
- Slave patrol
- Slave pen
- List of obsolete occupations
