= Kenneth Cork =

British accountant (1913–1991)

Sir Kenneth Cork GBE KStJ FCA FCIS FRSA

Lord Mayor of London
- In office 1978–1979

Personal details
- Born: Kenneth Russell Cork; 21 August 1913
- Died: 13 October 1991 (aged 78)
- Occupation: Accountant

Sir Kenneth Russell Cork (21 August 1913 – 13 October 1991) was a British accountant and insolvency expert, and the Lord Mayor of London from 1978–1979. He is best known for chairing a major review of UK insolvency law (whose report issued in 1982 is widely referred to as the Cork Report and led to the passing of the Insolvency Act 1986).

He was a partner in Cork Gully, a well-known firm of insolvency practitioners (established in 1935 with his father, WH Cork, and Harry Gully) which in 1980 became part of Coopers & Lybrand. Cork was recognised as an "insolvency baron" who had a dominant role in that field which set him apart from mainstream accountancy.

Prior to his election of Mayor he had served as a sheriff of London for 1975–76.

He also contributed to governance of the arts, as Vice Chairman of the Arts Council and Chairman of the Royal Shakespeare Company, and guiding other bodies including the Philharmonia Orchestra and London Festival Ballet.

== Family ==
Sir Kenneth's son, Sir Roger Cork (31 March 1947 – 21 October 2002), followed in his footsteps, both as a partner in Cork Gully and as Lord Mayor of London (1996–1997).

In 2010 Stephen Cork, great grandson of the original founder William Henry Cork, acquired Cork Gully from PwC and established Cork Gully LLP, as a new restructuring and insolvency firm in London.

== Publications ==
- Cork on Cork: Sir Kenneth Cork Takes Stock.

Honorary titles
Preceded by Sir Peter Vanneck	Lord Mayor of London; 1978–1979	Succeeded by Sir Peter Gadsden
