= Paul Newall =

Sir Paul Henry Newall

666th Lord Mayor of London
- In office 1993–1994
- Preceded by: Sir Francis McWilliams
- Succeeded by: Sir Christopher Walford

Personal details
- Born: Paul Henry Neuwald; 17 September 1934 London, England
- Died: 28 July 2015 (aged 80)

Sir Paul Henry Newall (17 September 1934 – 28 July 2015) was the 666th Lord Mayor of London.

== Early life ==
Sir Paul Newall was born Paul Henry Neuwald on 17 September 1934 in London, England. His father, Leopold, was an immigrant from Poland who prospered as a gown manufacturer. The family name "Neuwald" was changed to "Newall" in 1940. Paul was educated at Harrow School, and was also commissioned in the Royal Fusiliers for National Service, later going up to Magdalene College, Cambridge, to read economics.

== Career ==
He began his career with stockbrokers Cazenove & Co, and was then seconded to the jobbing firm of Durlacher, where he worked as a “blue button”, or runner, on the trading floor. After, he worked as an analyst, and later moved to join the Wall Street firm of Loeb Rhoades (later Shearson Loeb Rhoades) in the late 1960s, where he became a partner and made his name as a well-liked broker to institutional clients. From 1971 to 1977, he was a member of the New York Stock Exchange. In 1993 he became the Lord Mayor of London.

== Personal life ==
Paul Newall married Penelope Ridsdale in 1969, they had two sons together. Newall was introduced to Penelope Ridsdale by the author Barbara Cartland. Sir Paul Newall was diagnosed with cancer in July 2014 and died on 28 July 2015.

== See also ==
- List of lord mayors of London
