= Christopher Walford =

English solicitor

Sir Christopher Rupert Walford (15 October 1935 – 21 October 2015) was an English solicitor who served as the 667th Lord Mayor of London.

== Biography ==
Walford was born in London; his father was a barrister who worked as a legal assistant in the Ministry of Pensions. When the Ministry was evacuated to Blackpool in 1940, the family moved with it, returning to Kensington in 1949. Walford's civic life began in 1962 when he became a councillor for the Royal Borough of Kensington. In 1964, Kensington and Chelsea became one Borough, but he continued as a counselor becoming Deputy Mayor in 1974 and Mayor in 1979 of the now Royal Borough of Kensington and Chelsea. In 1982, he turned his thoughts to the City of London and was elected Alderman for the Ward of Farringdon Within. He was a Liveryman of the Worshipful Company of Makers of Playing Cards becoming Master in 1987. In 1993, he was Master of the City of London Solicitors’ Company. He was elected as the Aldermanic Sheriff in 1990. In 1994, he was elected Lord Mayor. He was knighted on 17, June 1995.

== Job positions ==
- City and Corporation
  - Freeman of the City of London 1964
  - Elected Alderman for the Ward of Farringdon Within 1982
  - Sheriff of the City of London 1990/91
  - Master of the Worshipful Company of Makers of Playing Cards 1987/88
  - Master of the City of London Solicitors Company 1993/94
  - Honorary Court Member Builders Merchants’ Company 1990
  - Member of the Guild of Freemen of the City of London
- Lieutenancy
  - One of HM Lieutenants for the City of London
- Charities
  - Trustee of Morden College, Blackheath
  - Trustee of the St Paul's Cathedral Choir School Foundation
  - Trustee of the Guildhall School, Music and Drama Foundation
  - Governor, Bridewell Royal Hospital

Civic offices
Preceded by Sir Paul Newall	Lord Mayor of London; 1994–1995	Succeeded by Sir John Chalstrey
