= John Chalstrey =

Lord Mayor of London

Sir John Chalstrey KStJ JP FRCS

668th Lord Mayor of London
- In office November 1995 – November 1996
- Preceded by: Christopher Walford
- Succeeded by: Roger Cork

Personal details
- Born: Leonard John Chalstrey; 17 March 1931 Tipton
- Died: 12 March 2020
- Spouse: Aileen Bayes (m. 1958)
- Children: 2
- Profession: Surgeon

Sir Leonard John Chalstrey (17 March 1931 – 12 March 2020) was a consultant surgeon and was 668th Lord Mayor of London from 1995 to 1996.

In 1995, he was knighted and named Master Apothecary of the Worshipful Society of Apothecaries.

He studied at Queens' College, Cambridge (1951–54) before transferring to Barts Medical School to complete his clinical medical training (1954–57).

From 1969 to 1996, Chalstrey was a senior lecturer at St Bartholomew's Medical College, about the historical funding of which he gave an address at Mansion House on 11 June 2001.

He was made a knight of the Most Venerable Order of the Hospital of Saint John of Jerusalem in 1995. He was an Honorary Colonel in the City of London Field Hospital of Royal Army Medical Corps.

Chalstrey was married in 1958 to Aileen Bayes; they had one son and one daughter.

== Death ==
Sir John Chalstrey died at his home on 12 March 2020 at the age of 88.

== Arms ==
Coat of arms of John Chalstrey

Crest
Upon a helm with a wreath Argent and Gules a lion statant holding up in the dexter paw a chalice Or issuant therefrom a dragonet Argent.
Escutcheon
Per fess Azure and Gules a Roman fort the entrance way closed and on each side a watch tower all Or masoned Proper between three lions passant Gold.
Motto
Servio Et Persevero (I Serve And I Persevere)

== Publication ==
- Chalstrey, John (2011). The Aldermen of the City of London, 1900-2010. Corporation of London. ISBN 978-0-85203-090-5.

Civic offices
Preceded by Christopher Walford	Lord Mayor of London; 1995–1996	Succeeded by Roger Cork
