= Worshipful Company of Salters =

Livery company of the City of London

Coordinates: 51.51811°N 0.09226°W

Salters' Company
- Salters' arms: Per chevron Azure and Gules three Covered Salts Argent garnished Or
- Motto: Sal Sapit Omnia
- Location: Salters' Hall, London EC2
- Date of formation: 1394; 632 years ago
- Company association: Salt and chemical industries
- Order of precedence: 9th
- Master of company: Anthony Cecil, 4th Baron Rockley,
- Website: salters.co.uk

The Worshipful Company of Salters is one of the Great Twelve City Livery Companies, ranking 9th in order of precedence.

An ancient merchant guild associated with the salt trade, the Salters' Company originated in London as the Guild of Corpus Christi.

== History and functions ==
The Salters' Company was first granted a Royal Charter of Incorporation in 1394, with further charters authorising the Company to set standards regulating salt industry products from the City of London. The formal name under which it is incorporated is The Master, Wardens and Commonality of the Art or Mystery of the Salters of London.

The Company was originally responsible for the regulation of salt merchants, but began losing control over the trade as the population of London increased and spread outwards from the City after the Industrial Revolution. Until the 19th century, the main use for salt was to preserve food for the winter months. Salt was probably the first traded commodity which if not available locally was imported.

Through careful stewardship of financial bequests and funds, the Company now serves as a significant educational and charitable institution whilst maintaining links with its heritage by supporting education in chemistry, for example by awarding scholarships to chemistry and science students, among whom is Sam Carling MP.

Since Sir Robert Bassett (for 1475/76), eighteen Salters have served as Lord Mayor of London, the most recent being Sir Richard Nichols (for 1997/98).

The Master Salter for 2026/27 is Anthony Cecil, 4th Baron Rockley, supported by the Company Wardens John Stebbing FRCS, Matthew Previte. and Johnny Nichols.

Since 2019, the Clerk to the Salters' Company is Lt-Col. Tim Smith.

== Salters' Hall ==
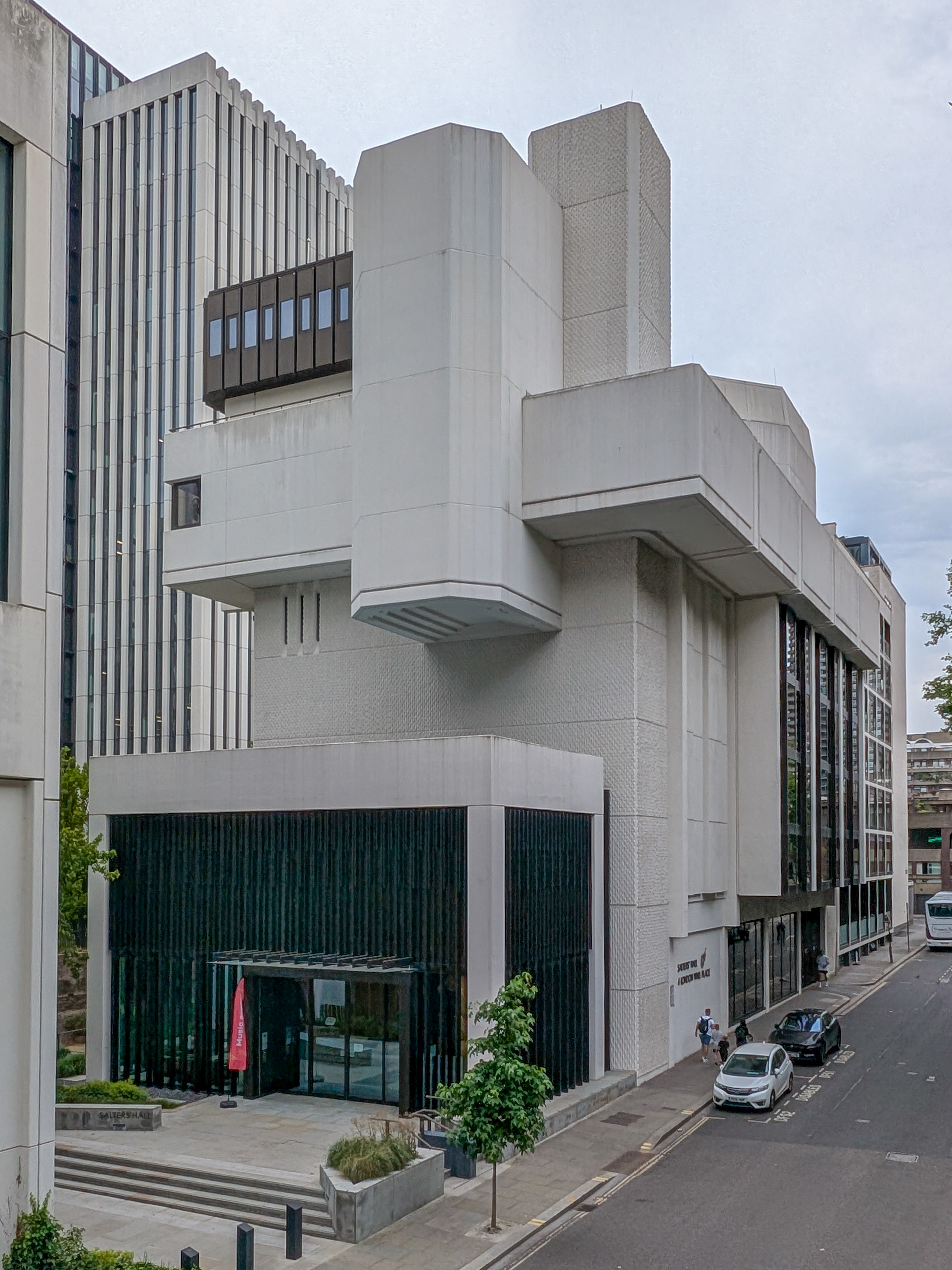
Salters' Hall, City of London

The former Salters' Hall in St Swithin's Lane London EC4, bombed in 1941, was during the 1700s a meeting place for Presbyterians and in 1719 the site of the "Salters' Hall controversy" a notable turning point for religious tolerance in England.

The present Salters' Hall on Fore Street, EC2 dates from 1976, designed by architect Sir Basil Spence, being Grade II-listed in 2010. A major redevelopment by architects de Metz Forbes Knight including a new entrance pavilion was completed in 2016.

== Salters' Institute ==
Established in 1918 as the Salters' Institute of Industrial Chemistry to support chemistry students after the First World War, particularly those whose studies had been interrupted by military service, the Salters' Company educational charity awards prizes for students of chemistry, chemical engineering, biology and physics (plus science technicians), as well as running various activities to promote the study of science.

== Coat of arms ==
The Company received a grant of arms in 1530 from Thomas Benolt, then its crest and supporters in 1591 from Robert Cooke, both Clarenceux Kings of Arms.

The Salters' arms are blazoned:
Escutcheon: Per chevron Azure and Gules three Covered Salts Argent garnished Or overflowing of the Third.
Crest: On a Wreath of the Colours a Cubit Arm erect issuing from Clouds all Proper holding a Covered Salt Argent garnished Or.
Supporters: Two Ounces Sable bezanty ducally gorged and chained Or.

Its motto is Sal Sapit Omnia, Latin for Salt Savours All.

== See also ==
- Drysalter
- Zunft
