= Francis McWilliams =

British engineer and Lord Mayor (1926–2022)

Sir Francis McWilliams GBE FREng FCGI

Chairman, Centre for Economics and Business Research
- In office 1992–2002

Lord Mayor of London
- In office 1992–1993

Personal details
- Born: 8 February 1926 Portobello, Edinburgh, Scotland
- Died: 31 August 2022 (aged 96)
- Occupation: Civil engineer, barrister

Sir Francis McWilliams (8 February 1926 – 31 August 2022) was a British engineer. He served as Lord Mayor of London from 1992 to 1993. During his period as Lord Mayor, the 1993 Bishopsgate bombing took place and his subsequent discussions with John Major led to the establishment of the Ring of Steel around the City of London.

== Life and career ==
Francis McWilliams was born on 8 February 1926, in a tenement house in Portobello, Edinburgh, and educated at Holy Cross Academy in Leith. While at Holy Cross, he and a fellow student, the artist Eduardo Paolozzi, were thrown out of class for misbehaviour. McWilliams was quoted as saying to the writer Michael Glackin: "The odds that the teacher was throwing a future world-renowned artist out of her class were probably long, but the odds on her throwing two future knights longer still."

McWilliams received a scholarship to attend the University of Edinburgh to study civil engineering when he was 16 years old. After graduating in 1945, he worked in the office of Edinburgh's City Engineer and then as a civil and structural engineer in other authorities. In 1953, he relocated to British Malaysia with his wife, Wyn, and their first child. They stayed for almost a quarter century. He worked for the Melaka municipal council and had his own consulting engineering practice there. While in Malaysia, he was the key engineer behind the civic planning for the town of Petaling Jaya in 1954. In March 1973, the sultan Salahuddin of Selangor awarded him the honour Datuk Diraja Selangor. He returned to the UK in 1976 and worked in the city of London, being appointed 665th Lord Mayor in 1992. He was later appointed Knight Grand Cross of the Order of the British Empire (GBE) by Queen Elizabeth II.

In 2015, he was disqualified from driving for 12 months, after being caught over the drink-driving limit outside the Bank of England at 2:30am in his 2.7-litre Jaguar XF. He was 89 at the time.

McWilliams died on 31 August 2022, at the age of 96. He is survived by his wife and two sons, one of whom is the economic consultant Douglas McWilliams.

Honorary titles
Preceded by Sir Brian Jenkins	Lord Mayor of London; 1992–1993	Succeeded by Sir Paul Newall
