= Worshipful Company of World Traders =

Livery company of the City of London

- Armorial bearings of the World Traders' Company
- Motto: "Commerce and honest friendship with all"
- Date of formation: 1985 (Royal Charter 2013)
- Company association: International Trade
- Order of precedence: 101st
- Master of company: Richard Burge 2025-26
- Website: www.world-traders.org/

The Worshipful Company of World Traders is one of the 114 Livery Companies of the City of London.

The Guild of World Traders was constructed in 1985 and it became a Company in 1993. Its petition for livery status was granted by the Court of Aldermen with effect from 2000. The Worshipful Company draws its membership from the international trade fraternity, with the aim of raising awareness and understanding of, and standards of practice in, world trade. The Company ranks 101st in the order of precedence of the City Livery Companies. Its motto is Commerce and Honest Friendship with All, taken from Thomas Jefferson's inaugural Presidential speech.

== Inspiration and creation as a Guild ==
The founding of the World Traders Association movement gave rise to the creation of trading complexes in over 160 cities throughout the world. London was the first in Europe, built in St Katharine Docks beside the Tower of London (though this World Trade Centre closed in 1994). Over 1,000 years earlier the same land was used by the Knighten Guilde to trade in foreign goods, and in 1979 the then Lord Mayor, Sir Peter Gadsden, suggested that this tradition be revived by the creation of the Guild of World Traders to represent members of the international trading community in the City of London.

The Company's founding Master was Mr Peter Drew OBE. From the outset the World Traders were determined to be a working Guild, only accepting members from the international trade fraternity, with the aim of raising awareness and understanding of, and standards of practice in, world trade.

The Company is a member of the Financial Services Group of Livery Companies.

== Activities ==
Members of World Traders consist of people with an interest in world trade. Many are brokers, traders or linked to financial services. As well as UK-based British nationals, a significant number of the Livery are overseas nationals based in the UK, dual nationals, British nationals who live overseas and overseas nationals who live in their home country.

The Company’s hallmark annual event is the Tacitus Lecture, begun in 1988, now one of the largest intellectual events in the City of London’s calendar. The event gives a senior individual an opportunity to initiate a discussion of serious concerns about world trade in a global forum.

== Key dates ==
23 November 1974 General Assembly of the World Trade Centers Association held at London Guildhall. Alderman Richard Charvet suggested the creation of the Guild of World Traders in London.

26 November 1979 Lord Mayor Alderman Sir Peter Gadsden laid foundation stone of International House (part of the then London World Trade Centre complex) and reiterates the suggestion of the creation of the Guild of World Traders.

24 October 1985 Foundation of the Guild of World Traders in London.

15 June 1993 Grant by the Court of Aldermen to become The Company of World Traders.

9 November 1999 Petition to become The Worshipful Company of World Traders agreed by the Court of Aldermen, with effect from 1 January 2000.

25 January 2000 Company received its letters patent in a ceremony at Mansion House, from the Lord Mayor, Alderman Clive Martin.

10 July 2013 Queen Elizabeth II granted a Royal Charter to the Company. The World Traders Company has company number RC000872 (RC denoting Royal Charter).

== Arms, Crest and Motto ==
The Arms of the Company were designed by Sir Colin Cole, Garter Principal King of Arms, and presented by him at the Installation ceremony of Alderman Sir Peter Gadsden, the Guild's new Master, in 1987. These Arms depict five purses symbolising trade between the five continents, with the sword and wheel of St Catherine together with the water and quayside of the dock, as a reminder of the company's foundation. The Arms are surmounted by an escarbuncle containing a medieval merchant's cap and the supporters are a dolphin borrowed from the Company of Watermen and Lightermen, who originally gave the company sanctuary in the City of London, and the sea dragon of the City as a mark of respect for its commands.

The Master's Badge of office displays the Company's coat of arms mounted on a piece of rock crystal, donated by the World Trade Centre of Rio de Janeiro, carved with an outline of five continents.

The motif on the Company tie derives from the Company's crest: it comprises the helm, torse and mantling surmounted by the wheel of St. Catherine upon which is a medieval merchant's cap.

The Company's motto is "Commerce and honest friendship with all", a quote from Thomas Jefferson's inaugural Presidential speech.

== Company Officers ==
Master: Mr Richard Burge

Senior Warden: Mr Andrew Marsden

Junior Warden: Mr Tim McNally CC

Clerk: Ms Liz Garner

== Past Masters ==
2024-25: Mr Mr Lars B. Andersen

2023-24: Mr Michael Larsen

2022-23: Mr Michael Shapiro

2021-22: Mrs Mary Hardy

2020-21: Ms Sue Algeo

2019-20: Mr Peter Alvey

2018–19: Dr Edwina Moreton OBE

2017–18: Alderman Professor Michael Mainelli

2016–17: Mr Robert Woodthorpe Browne OBE

2015–16: Miss Wendy Hyde CC

2014–15: Mr Mark Hardy JP DL

2013–14: Dr Heather McLaughlin

2012–13: Mr John Burbidge-King

2011–12: Miss Mei Sim Lai OBE DL

2010–11: Mr Graham Bishop

2009–10: Mr Michael Wren

2008–09: The Baroness Garden of Frognal PC

2007–08: Mr Robert Alston CMG QSO DL

2006–07: Mr Jack Wigglesworth

2005–06: Mr William King

2004–05: Mr Eric Stobart

2003–04: Mr Eric Tracey

2002–03: Mr John Stace

2001–02: Mr Bryan Whalley TD

2000–01: Miss Susan Hughes

1999–2000: Sir Roger Cork JP FCA

1998–99: Mr Peter Wildblood OBE

1997–98: Professor David Watt

1996–97: Mr Jim Davis CBE

1995–96: Mr Bryan Montgomery

1994–95: The Venerable Peter Delaney MBE AKC

1993–94: Mr George Capon

1992–93: Mr Peter Drew OBE

1991–92: Patrick Pery, 6th Earl of Limerick KBE AM

1990–91: Mr Richard Charvet RD JP

1989–90: Mr Peter Bowring CBE

1988–89: The Lord Bellwin of Leeds JP DL

1987–88: Sir Peter Gadsden GBE AC JP FREng

1985–87: Mr Peter Drew OBE

== Company Chaplains and Church ==
- The Revd Jennifer Midgley-Adam - Curate at All Hallows by the Tower and Interim Chaplain
- All Hallows by the Tower
