= Jack Wigglesworth =

British businessman

- Born: October 9, 1941 (age 84)
- Education: Oxford University
- Known for: Founder and former chairman of LIFFE
- Spouse: Carlota Josefina Páez (m. 1970)
- Children: 2

Jack Wigglesworth is a British businessman, founder and former chairman of LIFFE.

== Early life and education ==
Wigglesworth, was born in Leeds, United Kingdom and was the son of Jack and Gladys Maud (Haywood) Wigglesworth. Jack Wigglesworth obtained MA from Oxford University in philosophy, politics and economics in 1963.

== Career ==
Wigglesworth held a variety of roles in the City of London, including Economist at Phillips & Drew, Bond broker at W. Greenwell & Co. and Business Development Director at J.P. Morgan & Co.

He was founder Director of the Chartered Institute for Securities & Investment and a member of the Authorisation Committee and Enforcement Committee at the Securities and Futures Authority (SFA), a UK financial regulator at that time.

In 1982, he was one of the founders and became Chairman of London's Financial Futures Exchange (LIFFE).

In 1997, Wigglesworth was appointed chairman of ABN Amro subsidiary ABN AMRO Chicago Futures and remained there until October 1998.

== Later life ==
Wigglesworth was Chairman of London Asia Capital plc, the Emerging Markets investment bank founded by Simon Littlewood that was one of the first foreign private equity investors in China, and director of Gresham College.

In 2006-07 he was Master of the Worshipful Company of World Traders, one of the City of London's 110 livery companies.
