= Slave catcher =

People who tracked down escaped slaves in the United States

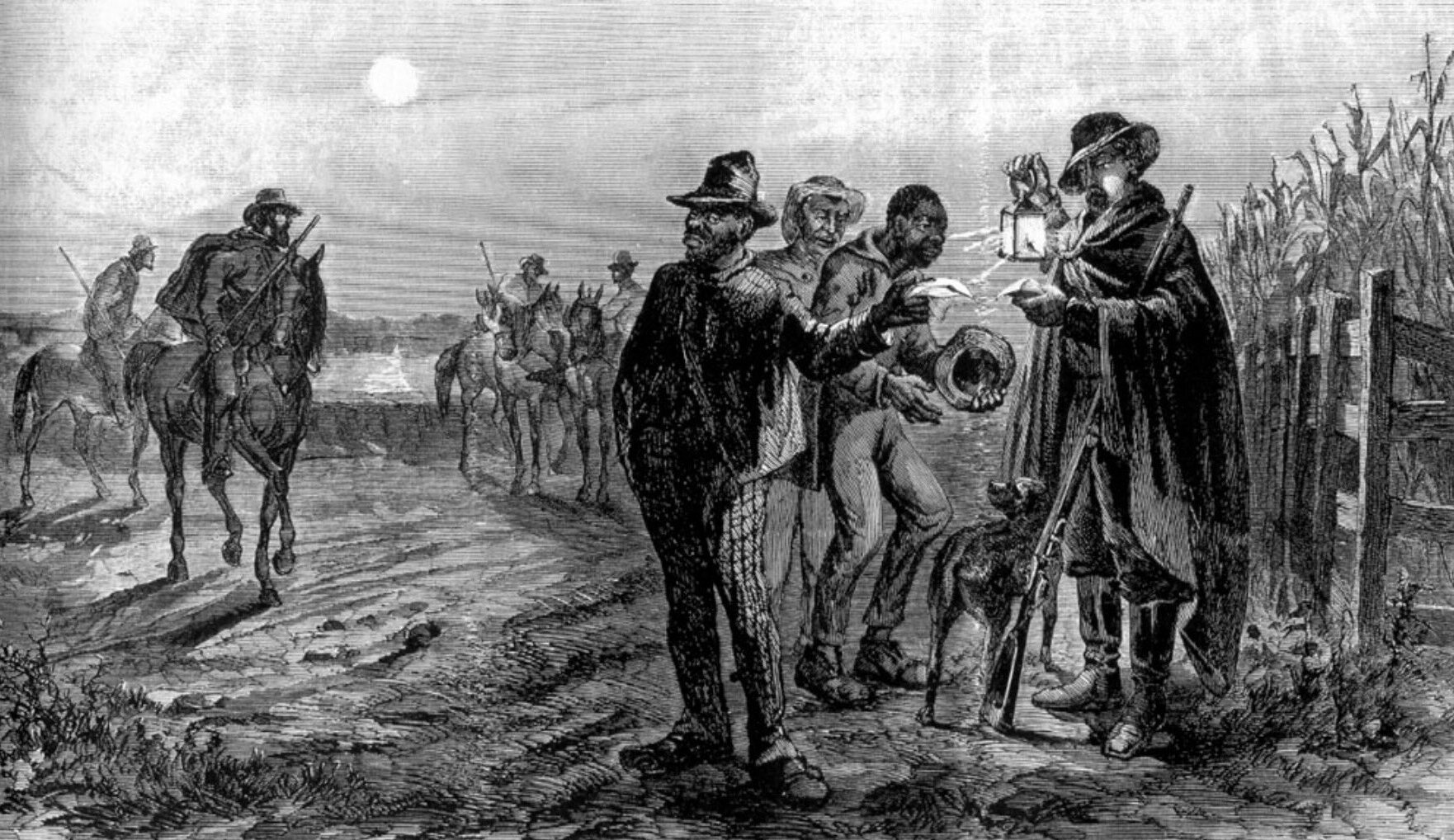
An illustration of slave patrollers inspecting the passes of a group of enslaved African Americans

A slave catcher is a person employed to track down and return escaped slaves to their enslavers. The first slave catchers in the Americas were active in European colonies in the West Indies during the sixteenth century. In colonial Virginia and Carolina, slave catchers (as part of the slave patrol system) were recruited by Southern planters beginning in the eighteenth century to return fugitive slaves; the concept quickly spread to the rest of the Thirteen Colonies. After the establishment of the United States, slave catchers continued to be employed in addition to being active in other countries which had not abolished slavery, such as Brazil. The activities of slave catchers from the American South became at the center of a major controversy in the lead up to the American Civil War; the Fugitive Slave Act required those living in the Northern United States to assist slave catchers. Slave catchers in the United States ceased to be active with the ratification of the Thirteenth Amendment.

== History of slave catchers in the Americas ==
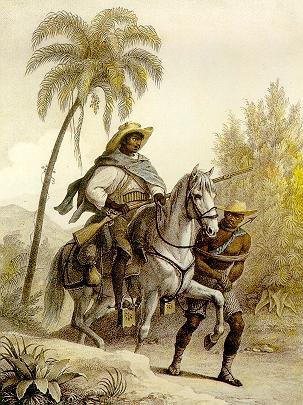
Illustration of a slave catcher in Brazil by German artist Johann Moritz Rugendas

The first slave catchers in the Americas were active in European colonies in the West Indies during the sixteenth century. In colonial Virginia and Carolina, slave catchers (as part of the slave patrol system) were recruited by Southern planters beginning in the eighteenth century to return fugitive slaves; the concept quickly spread to the rest of the Thirteen Colonies. Slave catchers in the Americas consisted of white colonists who were employed by planters to control the rapidly increasing enslaved population as a result of the transatlantic slave trade. These early efforts at establishing a slave patrol system were hampered by the small number of slave catchers who operated over a large landscape. As a consequence, many of the enslaved population managed to escape detection and flee to regions where they could live as free people of color.

== Law enforcement in colonial America ==
The colonial era of the United States saw the emergence of a law enforcement system modeled on those in Europe. In the Northern Colonies, these consisted of watchmen, who were employed by private citizens to police the streets and maintain order; in the Southern Colonies, law enforcement was primarily centered around policing the large population of enslaved African Americans who worked on plantations. These groups consisted of both planters and colonists which owned no slaves, and were paid by planters to search for escaped slaves. However, the Southern Colonies were much more sparsely populated than the Northern ones, presenting difficulties for slave catchers. Although slavery existed in the Northern Colonies, the majority of the enslaved population in Colonial America lived in the South, leading to a disproportionate amount of slave catchers being active in the region. Although historians have noted that the issue is underrepresented in American historiography, female planters would also participate in efforts to recapture escaped slaves. Nearly any prospecting individual could set out to be a slave hunter, but few were able to find much success.

These Southern law enforcement groups, which continued to be active after the American Revolution and the establishment of the United States, were created out of a need to maintain order among slaves and slave owners, rather than to protect the interests of the colonists which owned no slaves. Many Southern planters were considered irresponsible if their enslaved chattel property were allowed to escape, and it was a fear that more escapes would upend the system if not met with an immediate response. It was believed to be in the general interest of all planters to maintain discipline so that the enslaved did not have the chance to start a slave rebellion. Many states allowed local law enforcement to enlist the help of federal marshals, U.S. commissioners, and other local citizens. This spread to more states with the ratification of the Fugitive Slave Act of 1850, which required all citizens and local law enforcement to aid in the capture of runaway slaves. This meant that Northerners, many of whom were abolitionists, were forced to work with slave catchers, although they often found ways to evade the policy. Up until this point, many states did their best to thwart slave catchers by passing decrees such as Massachusetts’ personal liberty law of 1842, which barred slave catchers from seeking the aid of state officials. However, the Fugitive Slave Act of 1850 nullified these formal efforts, and abolitionists were forced to resort to small acts of defiance instead. In many areas, it could actually be dangerous to be a part of a slave catching group due to the hostility of the locals.

Under the Fugitive Slave Act of 1850, slave hunters could easily obtain an "Order of Removal", which approved the return of a runaway slave. However, these orders were often met with resistance from Northern abolitionists, who tried to intervene by blocking entry to the room where a fugitive was being held. Local government tried to shut this practice down by offering law enforcement agents a greater reward for returning a slave to the South than they could get from abolitionists who were willing to pay police to look the other way. During the Civil War, these law enforcement groups met with great difficulty, primarily because most of the white men were off fighting in the war. With the men gone, the duty to keep slaves in line fell on the women, who also had households to run. Lack of punishment and a greater likelihood of successful escape caused more and more slaves to run away. With slave patrols stretched so thin, many slaves were able to escape, and were often aided by enemy invaders. Many of the slaves joined Union ranks, the United States Colored Troops, taking up arms against their former owners.

=== Mercenaries ===
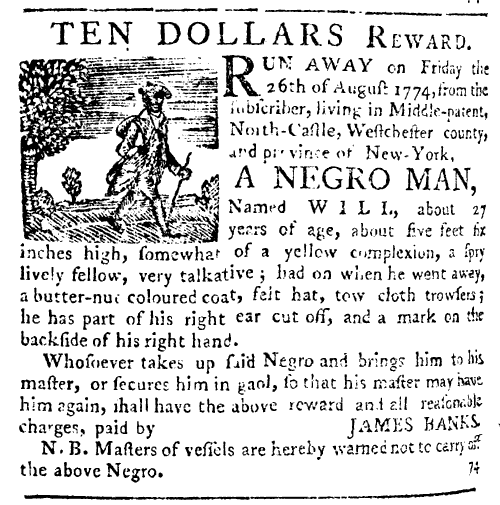
Advertisement of a reward for recapture of a fugitive slave

When an enslaved person ran away, they could expect to be questioned and asked to show their emancipation or manumission papers to prove that they were free by citizens or local law enforcement, who looked out for runaway slaves. Slave owners hired people who made a living catching fugitive slaves. Since these slave catchers charged by the day and mile, many of them would travel long distances to hunt for fugitives. Slave catchers often used tracking dogs to sniff out their targets; these were called "negro dogs." Though they could be of multiple breeds, the most well-known breeds included the now-extinct Siberian and Cuban Bloodhounds.

If a slave reached the Northern free states, a slave catcher's job was substantially more difficult; even if they did find the fugitive they could face resistance from anti-slavery citizens. If a slave managed to escape this far, slave owners typically sent an agent more closely connected to them, or put out notices about the escaped slave.

== Fugitive slave laws ==
White abolitionists and anyone else aiding in freeing or hiding of slaves were punished for their efforts. One account of drastic fugitive slave catching was approximately 200 U.S. Marines escorting one fugitive slave back into the custody of his owner. As laws even in the North punished both the people who helped slaves escape as well as the fugitive slaves, many fled to Canada where slavery had been abolished in 1834.

By the passage of the Fugitive Slave Act of 1850, slave catchers' jobs were made easier by the mandating of government officials to locate and prosecute runaway slaves, giving slave catchers more freedom to act under the law. With this law, slave catchers were reportedly able to gain warrants to apprehend those identified as fugitive slaves.

== Northern responses ==
The North became increasingly opposed to the idea of fugitive slave catchers. Several Northern states passed new personal liberty laws in defiance of the South's efforts to have slaves captured and returned. Slave catching was allowed in the North and the new laws in the North did not make it impossible to catch fugitive slaves. However, it became so difficult, expensive, and time-consuming that the fugitive slave catchers and the owners stopped trying.

The Fugitive Slave Act strengthened abolitionist response against slave catchers, with abolitionist groups including the Free Soil Party advocating for the use of firearms to stop slave catchers and kidnappers, comparing it to the American Revolution. The 1850s saw a significant rise in violent conflicts between abolitionists and law enforcement, with large groups forming to counter activities that threatened fugitive slaves. Slave catchers were heavily reduced in number during the American Civil War as many of them joined or were conscripted into the Confederate Army; and the institution of slave patrolling disappeared after the Thirteenth Amendment to the United States Constitution abolished slavery in the United States.

== See also ==
- Fugitive slaves in the United States
- List of obsolete occupations
- Slave catcher (Brazil)
- Slave markets and slave jails in the United States
- Slave patrol
