= Peter Gadsden =

652nd Lord Mayor of London (1929–2006)

Sir Peter Gadsden GBE AC KStJ JP DL FREng FIMMM

Lord Mayor of London
- In office 1979–1980

Personal details
- Born: Peter Drury Gadsden; 28 June 1929 Mannville, Alberta, Canada
- Died: 4 December 2006 (aged 77)

Sir Peter Drury Haggerston Gadsden (28 June 1929 – 4 December 2006) was a Canadian-born British chartered engineer and globe-trotting trader. He was the 652nd Lord Mayor of London in 1979 and 1980.

== Background ==
Gadsden was born in Mannville, Alberta, Canada, where his father, Basil Claude Gadsden, was a missionary priest, accompanied by his wife, Mabel Florence (née Drury). He was the eldest of their three children. His father had been ordained in Australia, and previously served in the East End of London. The family returned to England when he was five, and he grew up in a rectory in Shropshire. He was educated at Rockport School in County Down, The Elms School in Herefordshire, and Wrekin College in Shropshire, where he was head boy. After National Service in the King's Shropshire Light Infantry, he read geology and mineralogy at Jesus College, Cambridge.

== Career ==
In 1952, Gadsden joined Fergusson Wild & Co after graduating, becoming a minerals trader, known as "Trader Gadsden". He set up his own mineral consultancy in the 1960s, and became managing director of the Australian mining company Murphyores in London, in addition to other business interests. He was an honorary Fellow of the Chartered Institute of Marketing as well as the Institution of Mining and Metallurgy, a member of the London Metal Exchange and an underwriter of Lloyd's of London.

Gadsden was a member of seven livery companies, including the Worshipful Company of Clothworkers as well as the Worshipful Company of World Traders, and served as founder master of the Worshipful Company of Engineers from 1983 to 1985. Gadsden was elected to the Court of Common Council for the ward of Cripplegate in 1969, and was appointed Sheriff of the City of London in 1970. A year later, he became an alderman for the ward of Farringdon Without, remaining in that post until 1999: he was senior alderman for the last three years.

Gadsden was Lord Mayor of London in 1979–80 at the age of 50 and was invested as a Knight Grand Cross of the Order of the British Empire (GBE). He decided to hold a fireworks display on the River Thames as a climax to the Lord Mayor's Show, which has now become a regular feature of the event.

He was chairman of Private Patients Plan from 1984 to 1996, and then chairman of the PPP Healthcare Foundation until his death. Gadsden was past-chairman and vice-president of the Britain–Australia Society and served as chairman of the Britain-Australia Bicentennial Committee, leading up to the Australian bicentenary in 1988, for which he was awarded an honorary Companion of the Order of Australia, that country's highest civilian honour.

Despite residing in the United Kingdom, Gadsden retained his Canadian citizenship and passport until his death and worked to further closer ties between both countries.

== Family ==
Gadsden married Belinda Ann Haggerston, eldest daughter and heiress of Sir Carnaby Haggerston, 11th Baronet in 1955; they had four daughters. He adopted the additional surname "Haggerston" by Royal Licence in 1973, after his father-in-law's death. He died of a heart attack in Middleton Scriven in Shropshire aged 77.

A biography by Ina Taylor, Thoroughly with Enthusiasm, was published in 2004.

Honorary titles
Preceded by Sir Kenneth Cork	Lord Mayor of London; 1979–1980	Succeeded by Sir Ronald Gardner-Thorpe
