= Richard Burge =

British former CEO and government official (born 1958)

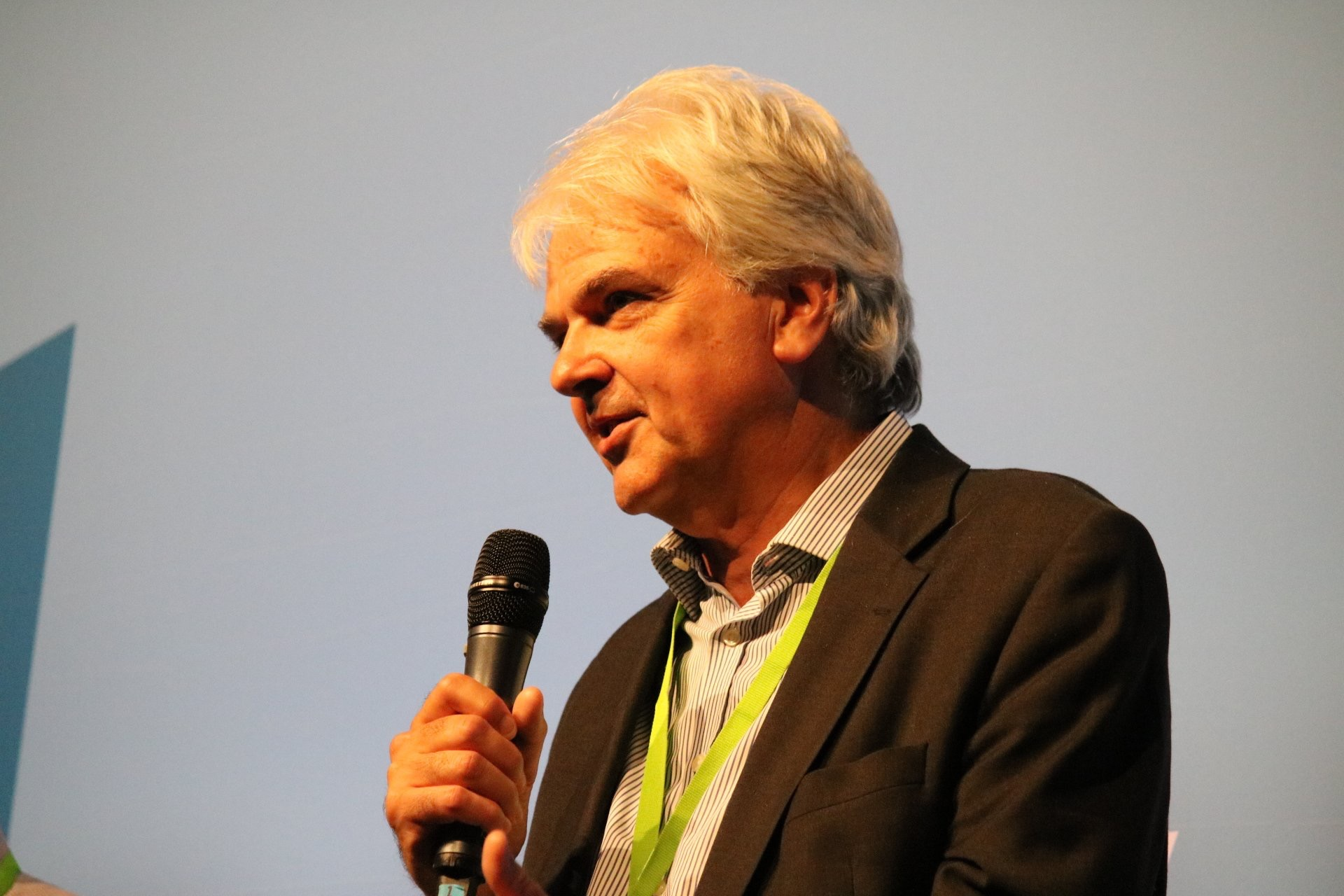
- Born: Richard David Arthur Burge; 5 April 1958 (age 68); Hong Kong
- Citizenship: United Kingdom
- Education: Adams' Grammar School; Durham University
- Occupations: Business executive and consultant
- Employer(s): British Council; Zoological Society of London; Countryside Alliance; Wilton Park
- Spouse: Karen Bush
- Children: 2

Richard David Arthur Burge (born 5 April 1958) is a British business executive and independent adviser who has held senior positions in government agencies, charities and the non-profit sector.

After an earlier career with the British Council, he was the first director-general of the Zoological Society of London from 1995 to 1999. He was subsequently chief executive of the Countryside Alliance until 2003, chief executive of Wilton Park from 2009 to 2017, and finally chief executive of the London Chamber of Commerce and Industry from 2020 to 2023.

== Early life and education ==
Burge was born in Hong Kong. He was educated at Adams' Grammar School in Newport, Shropshire.

He was the first member of his family to pursue higher education, and graduated from Durham University in 1980.

== Career ==
=== Early career ===
Burge taught biology at King Edward's School, Witley from 1980 to 1983, before spending three years as a Commonwealth Research Scholar at the University of Peradeniya in Sri Lanka.

He joined the British Council in June 1986 and spent the next nine years in its Overseas Career Service. He was assistant representative in Lagos, Nigeria, until March 1990. Returning to the United Kingdom, he held a series of posts culminating in three years as head of Africa and Middle East operations. He left the British Council in September 1995.

=== 1995–present ===
Burge was the first director-general of the Zoological Society of London from 1995 to 1999. During his tenure, he was credited with helping to restore the finances of London Zoo, which had previously faced the threat of closure. He left the society to become chief executive of the Countryside Alliance, a position he held until 2003.

From 2003 to 2009, Burge held a portfolio of part-time appointments, including strategy director of the African Parks Foundation and Commissioner for Rural Communities.

He was appointed chief executive of Wilton Park, an executive agency of the Foreign and Commonwealth Office, from 2009 to 2017. He then was chief executive of the Commonwealth Enterprise and Investment Council until 2019, and as chief executive of the London Chamber of Commerce and Industry from 2020 to 2023.

In 2019, Burge co-founded ESG Validation, an independent assessment company focused on environmental, social and governance standards in international trade.

== Political career ==
On 24 March 2022 Burge stood unsuccessfully for election as a Common Councillor for Vintry ward in the City of London.

On 28 May 2024 he was one of 120 "business leaders" who signed a letter expressing support for the Labour Party in the 2024 United Kingdom general election.

== Personal life ==
Burge is married to Karen, a business coach and mentor. They have two children and four grandchildren.

He is a member of the Worshipful Company of World Traders, and was elected junior warden in 2023, senior warden in 2024 and master the following year.
