= Drysalter =

Defunct dealer in a range of chemical products

Drysalters were dealers in a range of chemical products, including glue, varnish, dye and colourings. They might supply salt or chemicals for preserving food and sometimes also sold pickles, dried meat or related items. The name drysalter or dry-salter was in use in the United Kingdom by the early 18th century when some drysalters concentrated on ingredients for producing dyes, and it was still current in the first part of the 20th century.

== Background ==
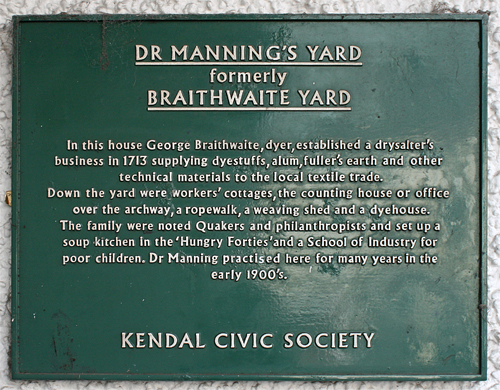
Braithewaite Yard, site of a drysalter in England

Drysaltery is closely linked to the occupation of salter which in the Middle Ages simply meant someone who traded in salt. By the end of the 14th century there was a guild of salters in London. Later salter was also used to refer to people employed in a salt works, or in salting fish or meat, as well as to drysalters.

In 1726, Daniel Defoe described a tradesman involved in the "buying of cochineal, indigo, galls, shumach, logwood, fustick, madder, and the like" as both dry-salter and salter. The Salters' Livery Company tells us that "some of the members who were salt traders were also 'Drysalters' and dealt in flax, hemp, logwood, cochineal, potashes and chemical preparations."

Being a drysalter might be combined with manufacturing – paint, for example – or with trading as a chemist/druggist or ironmonger/hardware merchant.

In contrast, a wet-salter could refer to a fish curer or to someone tanning leather by wet salting hides.

== See also ==
- Jill the Reckless (1920) by P. G. Wodehouse —Chapter VIII (II): 'The Dry-Salters Winged Derek'
- List of obsolete occupations
