= Iceman (occupation) =

Vendor who sells ice from a wagon

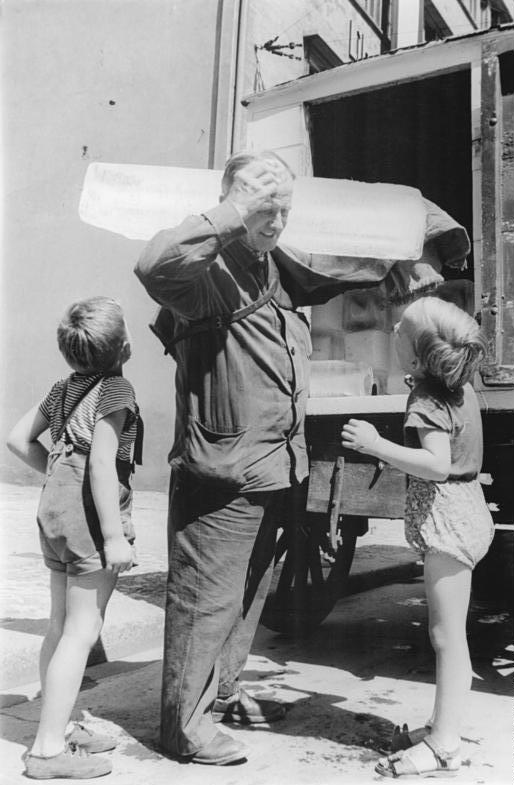
Iceman in Berlin, 1957

An iceman is someone who sells or delivers ice from a wagon, cart, or motor-truck. While the advent of modern refrigeration and freezers have made the profession increasingly uncommon, in previous eras of human history, the iceman transported and sold ice harvested in frozen regions to customers in warmer climates intended for cellars and iceboxes, to help preserve food and cool down beverages and homes.

== Description ==
The profession was formerly much more common than it is today. From the late 19th century to mid-20th century, in cities and towns icemen would commonly make daily rounds delivering ice for iceboxes before the electric domestic refrigerator became commonplace.

== Duties and functions ==
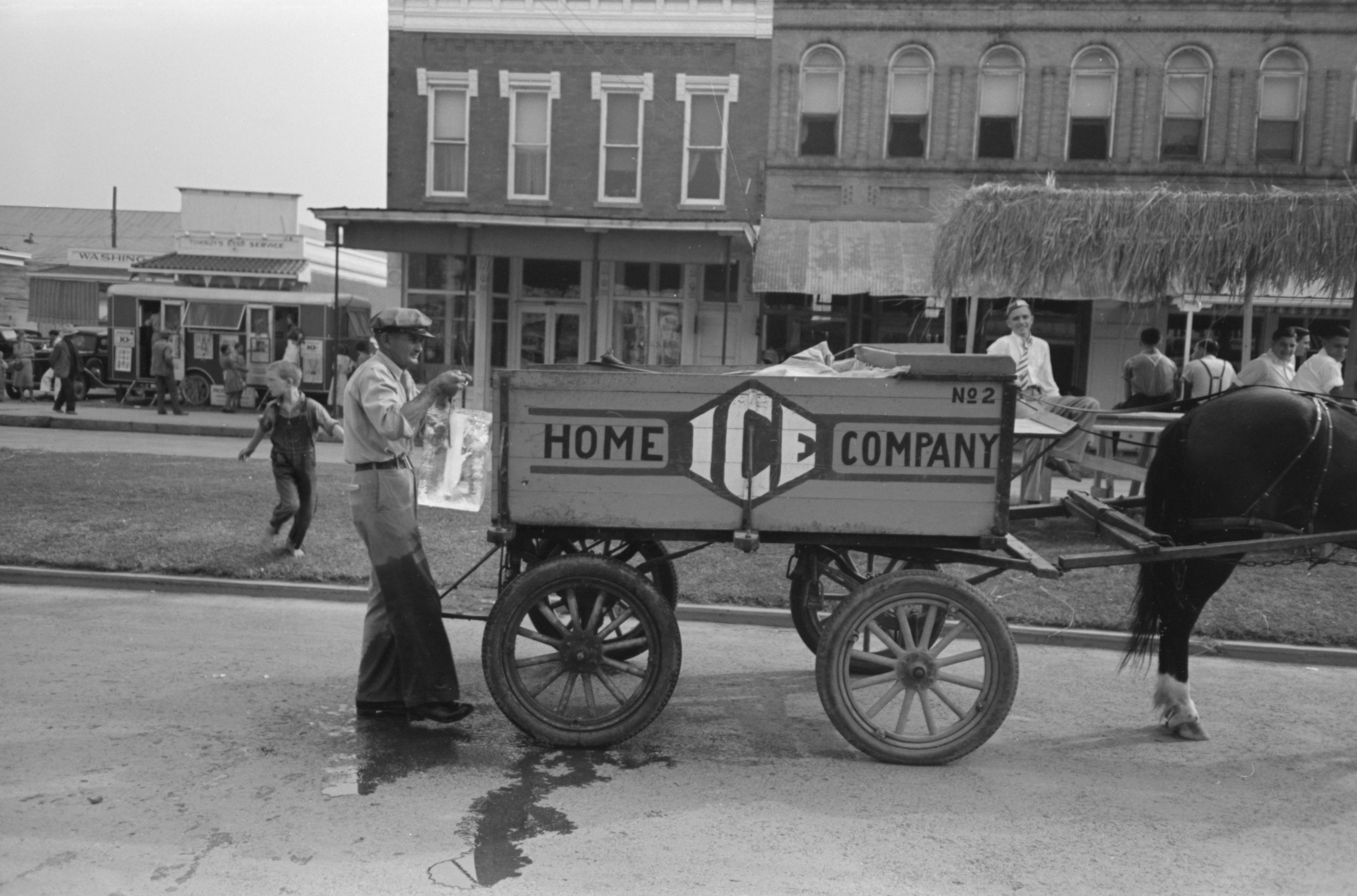
Iceman and ice-wagon in Crowley, Louisiana, 1938

Many icemen in the northeastern United States had origins in southern Italy. Arriving in the United States with little education or trade skills, many of these immigrants began ice routes, especially in New York City, where ice routes were a common sight. In those times, ice was harvested from ponds and lakes, stored in ice houses and transported to cities. Modern-day icemen no longer use a wagon or cart to deliver their ice, but instead use freezer trucks which contain pallets stacked with bags of ice cubes and large blocks (known as cakes) of ice. Many of the old-fashioned small-time routes were bought out in the 1980s and 1990s by large ice corporations that produce and sell ice as well as ice machines for restaurants and bars.

The tools of the iceman were wires (to tie the bags of cubes), hooks, tongs, and ice picks.

Being an iceman was arduous. Icemen usually began their day at 4:00 am and finished late in the evening, depending on both the season and day of the week. Many icemen worked seven days a week and through holidays.

As Arthur Miller recalls in his autobiography Timebends, "icemen had leather vests and a wet piece of sackcloth slung over the right shoulder, and once they had slid the ice into the box, they invariably slipped the sacking off and stood there waiting, dripping, for their money."

== Modern uses ==
The occupation of ice delivery lives on through Amish communities, where ice is commonly delivered by truck and used to cool food and other perishables.

== See also ==
- Ice trade
- Ice cutting
- List of obsolete occupations

== Bibliography ==
- Joseph C. Jones, J.R.: America's Icemen: An Illustrative History of the United States Natural Ice Industry 1665–1925. Humble, TX: Jobeco Books 1984.
