= Richard Nichols (solicitor) =

English solicitor and Lord Mayor of London

Sir Richard Everard Nichols (26 April 1938 – 13 March 2016) was an English solicitor and the 670th Lord Mayor of London.

Nichols was born in Watford, Hertfordshire, the son of Guy Everard Nichols and Patricia Mary Hurst. His father, clerk of the Salters' Company, died when he was 7 years old. With the assistance of the Salters' Company Richard was educated at Christ's Hospital School, Horsham, Sussex. He served in the Royal Engineers, 1956–58.

He joined a Watford-based firm of solicitors, becoming a senior partner in 1976. He joined the Salters' Company and became Master of the company for 1988–89.

Encouraged by the Company he became a Common Councilman on the City of London council in 1983 and an Alderman in 1984. He was elected Sheriff of London for 1994–95 and Lord Mayor of London for 1997–98. He was knighted on 4 November 1998.

He served as Chancellor of the University of Ulster from 2002 to 2010.

He married Shelagh Loveband and had two sons and a daughter. Around 1990 he jointly with others bought a 300-acre (120 Ha) farm in Kings Langley, Hertfordshire on which the family lived.

Civic offices
Preceded by Sir Roger Cork	Lord Mayor of London; 1997–1998	Succeeded by Peter Levene, Baron Levene of Portsoken
