= Job obsolescence =

Jobs becoming obsolete

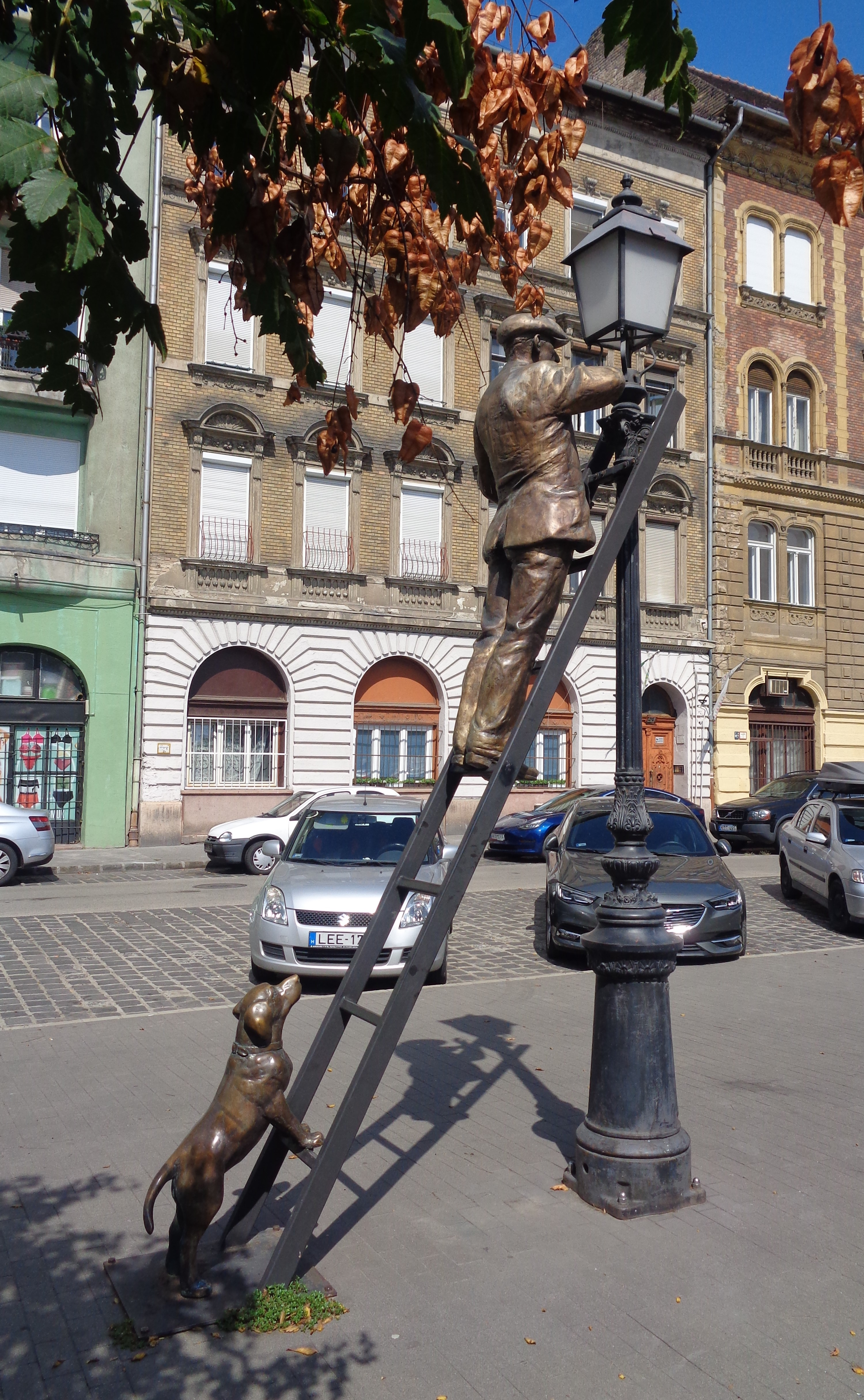
Lamplighter Monument in Budapest, Hungary, an occupation that was replaced by job obsolescence

Job obsolescence, occupational obsolescence or skills obsolescence, commonly shortened to jobsolescence, is a situation in which an occupation loses its field of work or its competitiveness is reduced compared to another more efficient one that fulfills the same function. This type of obsolescence is due to multiple factors, among the main ones are the development of new technologies that replace activities carried out by humans, as well as trades and economic activities that use objects that are discontinued due to cost reduction or search for greater efficiency.

== Job obsolescence ==
It is common with the development of new technologies and the passing of the years, some occupations that were previously profitable later become obsolete. A specific case of this is the job of lamplighter, which progressively disappeared after the invention of electric lamps and their widespread use in street lighting.

Experts in labor market and employability recommend to workers stay up to date on the time projections of the paid activities they carry out, as well as consider innovation as an important factor in their tasks.

In most cases, particularly after the Industrial Revolution, the emergence of new technologies brings with it fears about the loss of work and careers by sectors of workers who would be directly affected by implementing the new functions. However, it has been proven that applying new functions always brings with it the creation of new job alternatives with the creation of new tasks and occupations within a productive chain. According to Gallup, by 2023, 22% of workers in the United States expressed concerns about losing their jobs due to the potential obsolescence of their roles as a result of technological advancements.

== Obsolescence of skills ==
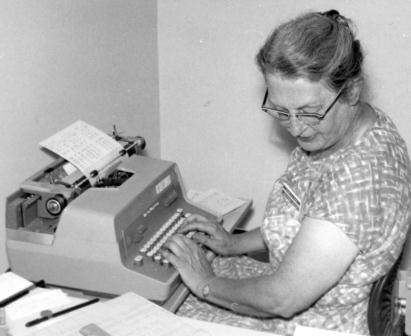
The occupation of typist on typewriters was replaced by writing on computer keyboards, making a change in skills, but not in the function itself

The evolution of the labor market, the increase and improvements in services with the use of new technologies that reduce the costs of processes, make them faster or of better quality, as happens with automation, it brings with it changes in the work skills of workers who perform a specific task. A common example that occurs with this is in computing, once new productivity software is released, such as office suites, or improved versions of these with new functions, users (office workers) must also stay updated with the use of these new systems. Otherwise, they will lose skills in their daily activities.

The European Centre for the Development of Vocational Training (Cedefop), an agency of the European Union (EU), recommends in the face of these events that all parties involved in a production process, employer and employee, must take responsibility and take an active part in the face of the obsolescence of skills.

In 1974, the educational technology expert Roger Kaufman defined the obsolescence of skills as "the extent to which professionals lack updated skills and knowledge", grouping them into two types:

- Obsolescence of physical skills: related to wear, atrophy and natural deterioration that decreases a person's physical performance.
- Obsolescence of intellectual competencies: when skills and knowledge, as well as other resources, such as technique and experience, lose relevance or are no longer necessary.

Obsolescence related to physical skills as a result of human aging is usually replaced with generational change.

== See also ==
- List of obsolete occupations
