= Bishop of Argyll and the Isles =

The Bishop of Argyll and the Isles refers to either of two bishops, each with a diocese overlapping the other's and belonging to a different church organization:

- Roman Catholic Bishop of Argyll and the Isles
- Bishop of Argyll and The Isles (Episcopal)

== See also ==
- Bishop of Argyll
- Bishop of the Isles
- Diocese of Argyll and the Isles (disambiguation)
