= Slave patrol =

Armed men who enforced discipline against slaves in the antebellum South

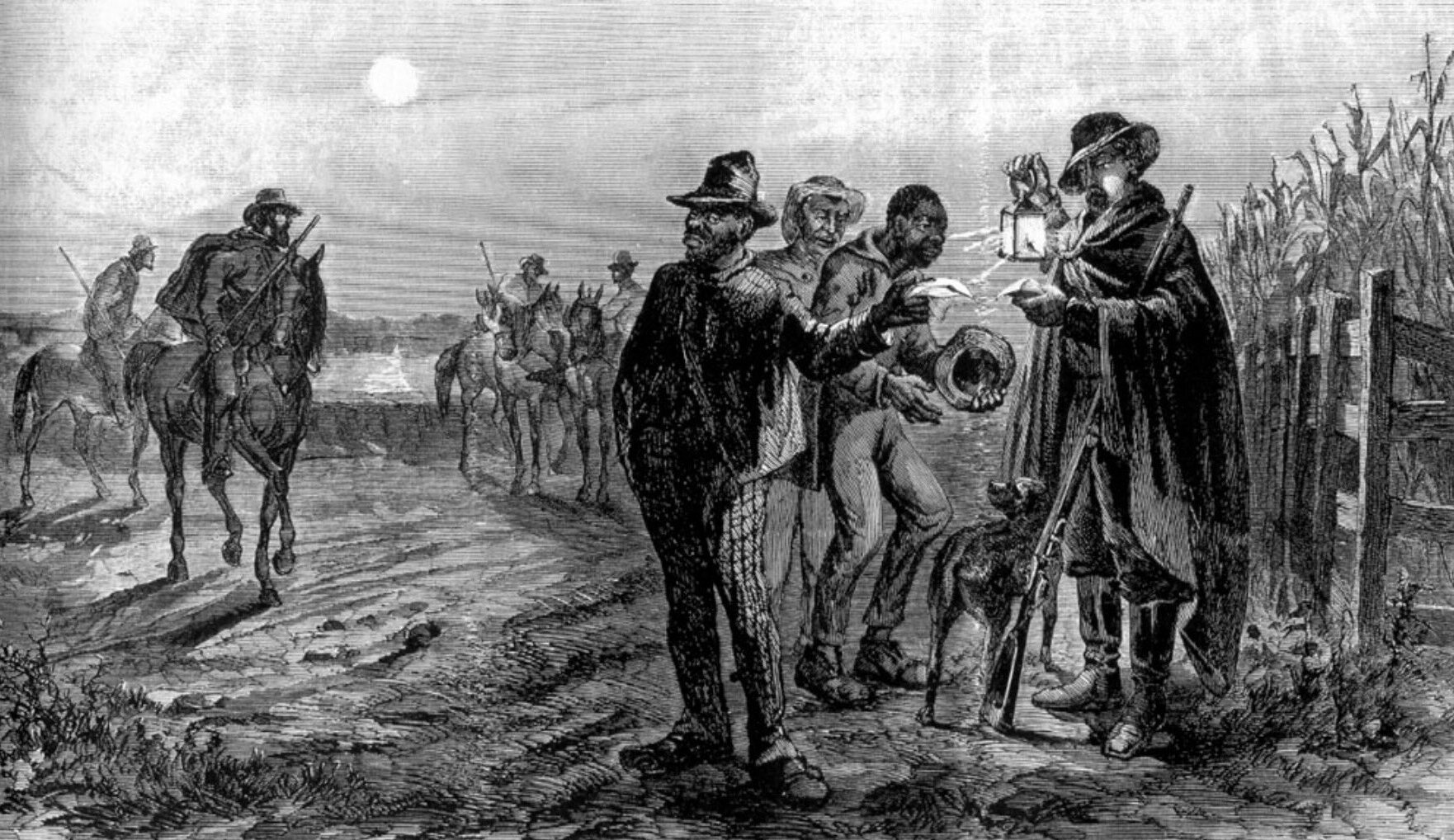
- Depiction of Mississippi slave patrol

Occupation
- Synonyms: Patrollers, patterrollers, pattyrollers, paddy rollers, sheriff
- Occupation type: Law enforcement or military (1704–1865)
- Activity sectors: U.S. southern states

Description
- Related jobs: Slave catcher

Slave patrols—also known as patrollers, patterrollers, pattyrollers, or paddy rollers—were organized groups of armed men who monitored and disciplined enslaved people in slave states in the U.S. during the Antebellum South. The slave patrols' function was to police slaves, especially those who escaped or were viewed as defiant. They also formed river patrols to prevent escape by boat.

Slave patrols were first established in South Carolina in 1704 and the idea spread throughout the Thirteen Colonies before the abolition of slavery following the Civil War.

== Formation ==
Slave patrols first began in South Carolina in 1704 and spread throughout the thirteen colonies, lasting well beyond the American Revolution. As colonists enslaved more Africans and the population of enslaved people in South Carolina grew, especially with the invention of the cotton gin, so did the fear of slave uprisings. They developed slave patrols when other means of slave control failed to quell enslaved people's resistance. Their biggest concern was how to keep enslaved people on the plantations being held against their will, since that is where enslaved populations were highest. Initially, slave owners offered incentives to the non slave owning whites, such as tobacco and money, to urge them to be more vigilant in the capture of runaway slaves. When this approach failed, slave patrols were formally established. Legislators introduced laws that enlisted white people in the regulation of enslaved people's activities and movement. Black people were subjected to questioning, searches, and other harassment. Slaves who were encountered without passes from their white "master" were expected to be returned to their owners, as stated in the slave code. If caught by patrols and returned to their masters, punishments included whippings and other physical violence, and the threat of being placed on the auction block and sold away from their families, an option for masters who no longer wanted to deal with "non-compliant" slaves.

== State militias as patrollers ==
Slave owners feared gatherings held by enslaved people would allow them to trade or steal goods, and had the potential for organizing a revolt or rebellion. South Carolina and Virginia selected patrols from state militias. State militia groups were also organized from among the cadets of the Southern military academies, of The Citadel and the Virginia Military Institute, which were founded to provide a military command structure and discipline within the slave patrols and to detect, encounter, and crush any organized slave meetings that might lead to revolt or rebellion.

== Slave codes and fugitive slave laws ==
The Fugitive Slave Laws helped enforce the necessity for slave patrols to abide by the law. Although these laws were initially created to keep tensions low between the north and the south, it caused the physical formation of slave patrols. During the Civil War, the theory of Contraband prevented the return of Southern slaves who reached Union-held territory. This helped limit the role of slave patrols/catchers and changed the war. Another form of help for slaves was the Underground Railroad, which aided slaves in their escape to Northern states. Outside of the Underground Railroad, enslaved Black people went further south to ensure their freedom. Black people also formed their own organized networks and means of escape from slavery to Florida, where Black people negotiated with Native Americans and the Spanish government, and were able to live self-determined and free lives. Formerly enslaved people formed their own towns, military, and merged with the Florida population as Seminoles. Formerly imprisoned Europeans, Irish immigrants, and other former institutionalized Europeans were immigrated through race-based policies to found the state of Georgia. They were partially recruited to form a buffer state to stop enslaved Black people from escaping from the Carolinas, Georgia, and Virginia to Florida. Slave patrols in Georgia were formed for this purpose. Free Black cities and armed and trained Black militaries in Florida were a direct challenge to White dominance and profits in slave-owning states. The concept of self-determined freedom was also a direct challenge to the concept that Whites should rule and to the institution of slavery. Slave patrols and plantation police were organized by Whites as legal and extra-legal means to stop this from occurring.

The use and physical formation of slave patrols came to an end in 1865 when the Civil War ended. This end, however, is linked to post-Civil War groups such as the Ku Klux Klan, which continued to terrorize and threaten the black community. In South Carolina, colonists began to write laws that constricted slaves long before slave patrols were alive and well. Laws implemented set in motion curfews for slaves, strengthening their militia, preventing slaves from bartering goods, and establishing the Charleston town watch. These are examples of some of the laws and ideas that molded what we know as slave codes.

== Patrollers' duties ==
Patrols enforced what were called slave codes, laws which controlled almost every aspect of the lives of enslaved people. Slave patrols were explicit in their design to empower the entire white population, not just with police power but with the duty to police the comings and goings and movements of Black people.

— "American Police", NPR.

Slave patrollers had their own characteristics, duties, and benefits, apart from slave owners and overseers. Patrollers were often equipped with guns and whips and would exert force in order to bring slaves back to their owners.

At times, black people developed many methods of challenging slave patrolling, occasionally fighting back violently. The American Civil War developed more opportunities for resistance against slave patrols and made it easier for enslaved people to escape. Slave patrol duties started as breaking up slave meetings.

Slave meetings included religious ones. Laws were passed, particularly around the 1820s and 1830s, that made religious gatherings of slaves and free blacks "unlawful assemblies." For example, Virginia passed a law in 1819 that banned any nighttime meetings of free blacks and slaves. South Carolina's law, by 1840, banned meetings at night for "mental instruction or religious worship," whether whites were present or not. In 1831, Mississippi made it unlawful for free blacks or slaves to "preach the gospel."

These slave meetings occurred on holidays, in which they would plan revolts and uprisings. Eventually, slave patrols expanded to be year-round, not just on holidays. Slowly, new duties and rights of patrollers became permitted, including: "apprehending runaways, monitoring the rigid pass requirements for Blacks traversing the countryside, breaking up large gatherings and assemblies of blacks, visiting and searching slave quarters randomly, inflicting impromptu punishments, and as occasion arose, suppressing insurrections."

Slave patrols consisted mostly of white citizens. Most people in slave patrols came from working and middle-class conditions. In some southern states, the militia and army served as slave patrols. In other southern states, slave patrols came about from colonial or state government legislation. Slave patrols typically rode on horseback in groups of four or five, sometimes even in family groups. They often worked sun-up to sun-down and varied their times and locations of patrol, to lower the chances of slaves escaping. They used no special equipment. Their chief tools, instead, were whips and intimidation..

Some states required every white man to arrest and chastise any slave found away from his home without proper authorization. In colonial South Carolina, failure to do so incurred a fine of forty shillings. Recaptured slaves were returned to their masters. In some instances, white men encouraged slaves to escape in order to collect rewards for catching them. In some areas, killing a slave was not considered a crime by the courts or community.

Slave patrollers were compensated in several ways, including exemption from public, county, and parish taxes and fees during their terms of service. In addition, some patrollers were paid additional sums with surplus money.

Also, regardless of the power patrollers held, they had limitations. For example, although whippings and beatings were permitted, a deterrent also existed. This was that, if whipped or beaten too severely, the slave was then of no use to their masters as laborers the next day. As a consequence, overly-brutal patrollers could expect retaliation from slave owners.

== Diminishing use ==
=== American Civil War ===
The Civil War, which lasted four years, directly threatened the very existence of slavery and, in turn, slave patrols. The first year after the Civil War began, slave patrols increased. Confederates were expecting slave revolts, which inspired them to appoint more patrols. As the war dragged on, more and more White men were being called upon to serve in the Confederate army. White men who would have served in slave patrols had they remained in their communities, went to serve in the Confederate army. Some young men who were turned away by the army, mostly for medical reasons, ended up taking places within the slave patrols. As slave owners entered the Confederate army, some slaves lost the shield they once had to protect them from the harsh and brutal beatings.

After the Emancipation Proclamation, the increasing number of White men being called to the militias of the South in 1862 and 1863 resulted in many slave patrols simply not having enough men to be as active as they once were. As the Union army moved into local areas and communities, the likelihood that enslaved people that could flee to the areas controlled by the Union increased. Slaves who were considered obedient started to disappear in the night, running toward the Union army to emancipate themselves.

=== Reconstruction ===
With the war lost, Southern Whites' fears of African Americans increased in 1865 due to Reconstruction governments that were perceived as oppressive to the South. Even though slavery and patrols were legally ended, the patrol system still survived. Almost immediately after the war, informal patrols sprang into action. Later, city and rural police squads, along with the help of Union army officers, revived patrolling practices among free men. From 1865 to 1877, old-style patrol methods resurfaced and were enforced by postwar Southern police officers and also by organizations such as the Ku Klux Klan.

== See also ==
- Law enforcement in the United States
- Slave catcher
- Kidnapping into slavery in the United States
- Treatment of slaves in the United States
- Underground Railroad
