= Roger Cork =

British accountant (1947–2002)

Sir Roger William Cork (31 March 1947 – 21 October 2002) was a British accountant and insolvency expert, and the 669th Lord Mayor of London (from 1996 to 1997).

Roger Cork was born on 31 March 1947 in Hatch End, Middlesex, the son of Sir Kenneth Cork. He went to St Martin’s School, Northwood, and then to Uppingham. Cork followed his father as alderman for Tower ward in 1983, and was Sheriff of the City in 1992-93. He was president of the Institute of Credit Management.

In 1999-2000, he was Master of the Worshipful Company of World Traders, one of the City of London's 110 livery companies. He was knighted in the 1997 Birthday Honours.

Sir Roger Cork died on 21 October 2002, aged 55.

Honorary titles
Preceded by Sir John Chalstrey	Lord Mayor of London; 1996–1997	Succeeded by Sir Richard Nichols
