= Ice cutting =

Cutting of ice in winter that is stored for cooling in summer

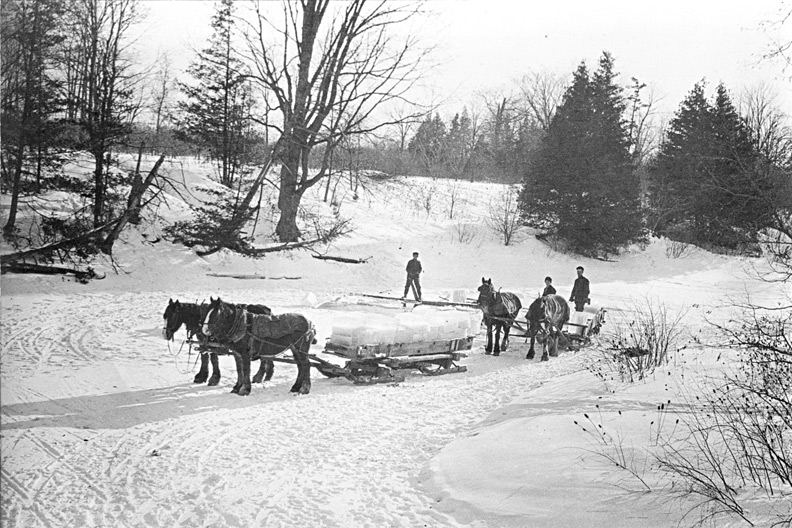
Icecutters in Toronto, Ontario, Canada, 1890s

1919 filmreel of ice-harvesting in Pennsylvania, US (silent)

Ice cutting is a winter task of collecting surface ice from lakes and rivers for storage in ice houses and use or sale as a cooling method. Rare today, it was common (see ice trade) before the era of widespread mechanical refrigeration and air conditioning technology.

== History ==
The work was done as a winter chore by many farmers and as a winter occupation by icemen. Kept insulated, the ice was preserved for cold food storage during warm weather, either on the farm or for delivery to residential and commercial customers with ice boxes. A large ice trade existed in the 19th and early 20th centuries, until mechanical refrigeration displaced it. Due to its harvesting and trade, ice was considered a "crop".

Ice harvesting generally involved waiting until approximately a foot of ice had built up on the water surface in the winter. The ice would then be cut by hand with an Ice saw or later, a powered saw blade into long continuous strips and then cut into large individual blocks for transport by wagon back to the ice house. Because snow on top of the ice slows freezing, it could be scraped off and piled in windrows. Alternatively, if the temperature is cold enough, a snowy surface could be flooded to produce a thicker layer of ice. A large operation would have a crew of 75 and cut 1500 tons daily.

Ice cutting was a considerable export industry for northern countries in Scandinavia and North America during the 19th century. It started in the United States around 1800, and spread to Scandinavia around 1820; by the mid century Norway had become a major exporter to England, Europe, the Mediterranean, and as far away as Kingdom of Kongo, Egypt and New York. Coastal Telemark had 1,300 workers exporting 125,000 tons in 1895–96, while the Oslo Fjord was the main European export region with Nesodden municipality alone employing 1,000 men and exporting 95,000 tons in 1900, at a time when Norway's combined ice export at 500,000 tons stood as the world's largest.

Domestic production and sales were the largest single market source for ice in America and Europe. From the 1850s onwards ice cutting took on large-scale industrial proportions in Germany with Berlin as a key market. In the 1880s, New York City had over 1500 ice delivery wagons and Americans consumed over 5 million tons of ice annually.

== Modern usage ==
Ice cutting is still in use today for ice sculpture and snow sculpture events. A swing saw is used to get ice out of a river for the Harbin International Ice and Snow Sculpture Festival each year. A swing saw is also used to cut ice out from the frozen surface of the Songhua River, China.

Many ice sculptures are made from the ice harvested this way. In some countries at high latitudes, ice hotels and ice palaces are made.

== See also ==
- Ice trade
  - Frederic Tudor
  - Nathaniel Jarvis Wyeth
- List of obsolete occupations
