= Elevator Strikes =

Labor strikes of Elevator Operators

The Elevator Strikes were a series of labor strikes that took place from the 1920s to the 1960s across the United States, but most notably in New York, Philadelphia, and Chicago.

Before the automation of elevators, elevator operators had to "open and close the manual doors, control the direction and speed of the car, take requests from passengers on board, and announce what businesses were located on each floor as they approached." Prior to the world wars, this role was mainly held by men. However, once the wars began, advertisements were placed looking for women to serve as operators.

The work was demanding and provided underwhelming compensation. In a 1917 New York Times news article, a call was placed for elevator girls. The posting warned about exploitation, as operators "[came] under none of the regular labor laws;" worked long hours, without meals; and received $32.50 to $45 a month."

== Appearances ==
In order to do this job, female elevator operators, called elevator girls, had to attend "charm school." The elevator operators for Marshall Field & Co. in Chicago, were required to attend an 8-week long course, where they learned how to dress, do their makeup, lose weight, clearly announce key merchandise areas, and answer customer questions. As a result, sales increased, and operators were "happier and more beautiful."

Not only in Chicago, but across the United States, maintaining a polished appearance was seen as important to the success of elevator girls. In an office building in New York, female elevator operators had to maintain their dyed red hair; and wear white uniforms, which included cosmetics and silk stockings.

Many of the girls sought to emulate Dorothy Lamour, a famous actress, who was discovered working as an elevator girl in Chicago.

== 1920s Strikes ==
In April 1920, 17,000 elevator operators went on strike in New York City. Roughly 900 of these strikers were women. The strike was due to operators seeing wage cuts of 10–15%; and, nightmen working 84 hours a week, with no days off. As a result, they asked for wage increases of 25–30%, an eight-hour workday, and for the union to be recognized.

With no one to operate the elevators, tenants and firemen began running the elevators themselves. The New York Times reported several people were killed in elevator accidents that were not being controlled by trained operators. Most people were too fearful to operate the elevators themselves, leaving them to walk up and down flights of stairs in the tall New York buildings.

In response to the strikes, W.T. Ropes, Chairman of the Employees Committee of the Building Managers and Owners' Association, said, "The trouble is that these men have picked easy jobs and are asking for wages to which they are not entitled by their service." Ropes also said that women would replace the men on strike, and that a new operator could be trained within several hours.

Within a week, the momentum of the strike had dwindled. Over 200 agreements were made between operators and building managers, which resulted in over 5,000 elevator operators returning to work.

In 1925, the union organized another strike of the elevator operators, and called on others like firemen, engineers, and maintenance employees to join.

== 1930s Strikes ==
In April 1934, the elevator operators formed a union: Local 32-B.

In November of that year, members of the union went on strike for demands of $25 a week, an eight-hour work day, a forty-hour work week, and the recognition of the union. President of the union, James Bambrick, warned Mayor Fiorello Henry La Guardia and Governor Herbert Lehman that, "5,000 armed guards had been brought into the city for strike duty…many of [the] men were known to have criminal records," and that intervention was needed to prevent violence.

In response to the strikes, the Realty Advisory Board on Labor Relations recommended that elevator operators work no more than 48 hours a week, and provided salary suggestions for male elevator operators, based on the number of floors they service.

Days later, Mayor LaGuardia successfully postponed the strike by inviting members of the union and employers for a conference mediation. Union leaders attempted to stall the pending strike, and warned if the conference failed, "there would be no more conferences but 'immediate action.'" Soon thereafter, strikers of 400 buildings in Manhattan's garment district won union rights.

== 1940s Strikes ==
In the 1940s, elevator operators were a part of a large strike wave that occurred after World War II. September 1945 was marked by large strikes in New York City. 15,000 workers joined the picket line, leaving the city at a standstill. This left mail undeliverable, railways frozen, and caused federal tax collections to fall "eight million dollars a day." Reports suggest that "about 1.5 million fellow New Yorkers would not cross the picket lines, nor would they climb the stairs." Businesses were unable to trade, receive shipments, or sell their merchandise.

Mayor La Guardia called on the strikers to end the strike, "as a token of good faith to [their] fellow wage-earners in [the] city, to organized labor." Eventually, after a full business week, Governor Thomas E. Dewey intervened, demanding that the union and employers submit the issues to binding arbitration.

== Elevator Automation ==
The elevator strikes were instrumental to the automation of the elevator. As elevators were a dangerous machine that could only be comfortably operated by elevator operators, manufacturers began adding safety features and allowing the elevator to run on its own. New features included emergency phones, emergency stop buttons, and alarms.

In the 1950s, Otis Elevator created many automatic elevators and created advertisements centered on their automation. Over time, most elevators did not need operators, and were running on their own.
