= Robert Bassett (MP) =

English Member of Parliament (MP) and Lord Mayor of London

Robert Bassett (died 1484), was an English Member of Parliament (MP) and Lord Mayor of London in the 15th century.

A Master Salter, Bassett was elected as Member of the Parliament of England for the City of London in 1460, and served as Lord Mayor for 1475/76.
