= HMS Argyll =

Several ships of the Royal Navy have been named HMS Argyll after the region of Argyll in Scotland. Her motto is ne obliviscaris (lest we forget).

- HMS Argyll (1715), a 50-gun fourth-rate ship of the line, launched in 1650 as the 38-gun President, renamed HMS Bonaventure in 1660, rebuilt four times and renamed HMS Argyll in 1715. She was sunk in 1748 as a breakwater.
- HMS Argyll (1904), a Devonshire-class armoured cruiser commissioned in 1905. She ran aground on the Bell Rock at the head of the Firths of Forth and Tay in 1915.
- HMS Argyll (F231), a Type 23 Duke-class frigate commissioned in May 1991. She has been involved in a number of deployments, most successfully during the Sierra Leonean Civil War in 2000 including Operation Barras, and Operation Telic IV in the Persian Gulf from February–August 2005.

== Battle honours ==
Ships named Argyll have earned the following battle honours:

- Passero, 1718
