= Diocese of Argyll and the Isles =

Diocese of Argyll and the Isles can refer to:

- Diocese of Argyll and The Isles (Episcopal), of the Scottish Episcopal Church
- Roman Catholic Diocese of Argyll and the Isles, of the Catholic Church
