= Ice trade =

19th-century and early 20th-century industry

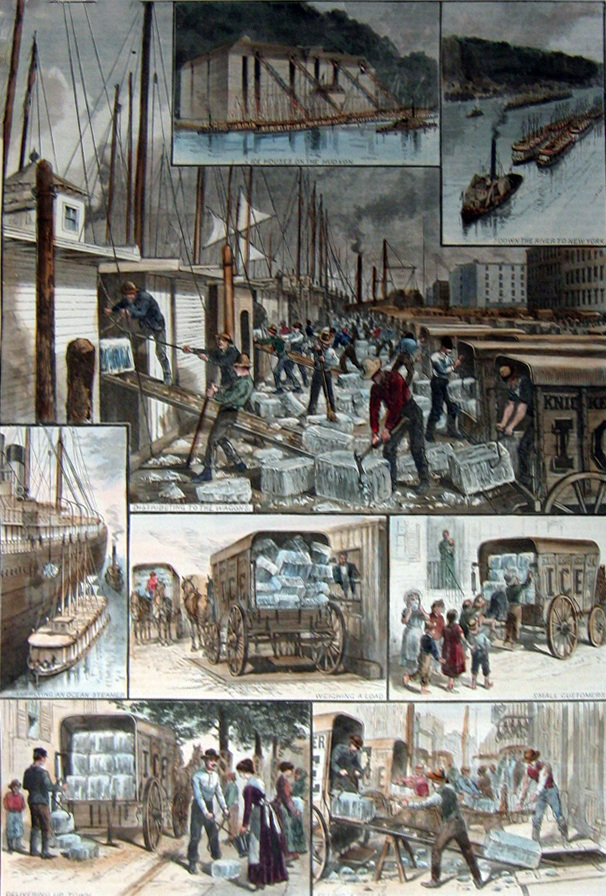
The ice trade around New York City; from top: ice houses on the Hudson River; ice barges being towed to New York; barges being unloaded; ocean steamship being supplied; ice being weighed; small customers being sold ice; the "uptown trade" to wealthier customers; an ice cellar being filled; by F. Ray, Harper's Weekly, 30 August 1884

The ice trade, also known as the frozen water trade, was a 19th-century and early 20th-century industry, primarily catering to demand on the east coast of the United States. Ice was both harvested locally in the winter months and stored for later sale in the summer, and was also imported from polar regions where it could be sourced year round, with Norway becoming the largest exporter of ice.

The trade involved the large-scale harvesting, transport and sale of natural ice, and later the making and sale of artificial ice, for domestic consumption and commercial purposes. Ice was cut from the surface of ponds and streams, then stored in ice houses, before being sent on by ship, barge or railroad to its final destination around the world.

The trade was started by the New England businessman Frederic Tudor in 1806. Tudor shipped ice to the Caribbean island of Martinique, hoping to sell it to wealthy members of the European elite there, using an ice house he had built specially for the purpose. Over the coming years the trade widened to Cuba and the Southern United States, with other merchants joining Tudor in harvesting and shipping ice from New England. During the 1830s and 1840s the ice trade expanded further, with shipments reaching England, India, South America, China and Australia. (Note: In One Hundred Years of Solitude, by Gabriel Garcia Márquez, the gypsy Melquíades, sometime in the early to mid-1800s, visits Macondo (in present-day Colombia) and brings José Arcadio Buendía a block of ice. José Arcadio, seeing ice for the first time, proclaims it to be “the greatest invention of our time.”) Tudor made a fortune from the India trade, while brand names such as Wenham Ice became famous in London. Increasingly, however, the ice trade began to focus on supplying the growing cities on the east coast of the U.S. and the needs of businesses across the Midwest. The citizens of New York City and Philadelphia became huge consumers of ice during their long, hot summers, and additional ice was harvested from the Hudson River and Maine to fulfill the demand. Ice began to be used in refrigerator cars by the railroad industry, allowing the meat packing industry around Chicago and Cincinnati to slaughter cattle locally, before sending the dressed meat onward to either U.S. domestic or international markets.

Networks of ice wagons were typically used to distribute the product to the final domestic and smaller commercial customers. The ice trade revolutionized the U.S. meat, vegetable and fruit industries, enabled significant growth in the fishing industry, and encouraged the introduction of a range of new drinks and foods. It only flourished in the time between the development of reliable transportation and the development of widespread mechanical refrigeration. Chilled refrigerator cars and ships created a national industry in vegetables and fruit that could previously only have been consumed locally. U.S. and British fishermen began to preserve their catches in ice, allowing longer voyages and bigger catches, and the brewing industry became operational all-year round. As U.S. ice exports diminished after 1870, Norway became a major player in the international market, shipping large quantities of ice to England and Germany.

At its peak at the end of the 19th century, the U.S. ice trade employed an estimated 90,000 people in an industry capitalised at $28 million ($660 million in 2010), (Note: Comparing historic prices and costs is not straightforward. This article uses real price comparison for the costs of ice and sawdust; the historic value of living measure for incomes; the historic opportunity cost for capitalisation and similar project. Figures are rounded off to the same level precision as the original, and expressed in 2010 terms.) using ice houses capable of storing up to 250,000 tons (220 million kg) each; Norway exported a million tons (910 million kg) of ice a year, drawing on a network of artificial lakes. Competition had slowly been growing, however, in the form of artificially produced plant ice and mechanically chilled facilities. Unreliable and expensive at first, plant ice began to successfully compete with natural ice in Australia and India during the 1850s and 1870s respectively, until, by the outbreak of World War I in 1914, more plant ice was being produced in the U.S. each year than naturally harvested ice.

Despite a temporary increase in production in the U.S. during the war, the interwar years saw further developments (especially the widespread adoption of mechanical refrigerators at the domestic level) which caused the total collapse of the international ice trade. In some isolated rural areas without access to electricity, the lack of which precluded the use of refrigerators, and also where plant ice was typically not economically viable and where natural ice was usually free of pollutants, ice continued to be harvested and sold at the local level until after World War II. Today, ice is occasionally harvested for ice carving and ice festivals, but little remains of the 19th-century industrial network of ice houses and transport facilities.

== History ==
=== Pre-19th century methods ===
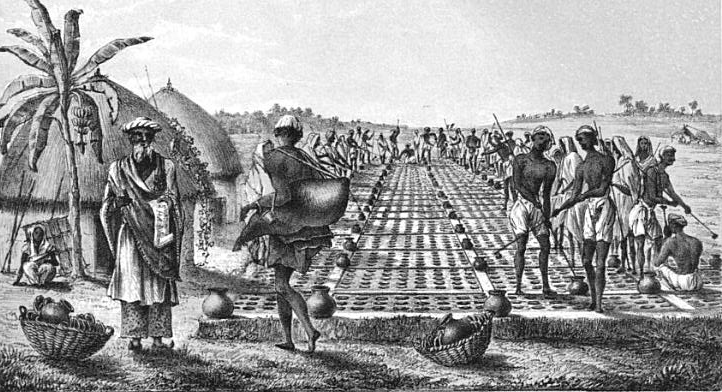
Ice manufacture near Allahabad in 1828, by skimming ice from water-filled pots

Prior to the emergence of the ice trade of the 19th century, snow and ice had been collected and stored to use in the summer months in various parts of the world, but never on a large scale. In the Mediterranean and in South America, for example, there was a long history of collecting ice from the upper slopes of the Alps and the Andes during the summer months and transporting this down into the cities. Similar trading practices had grown up in Mexico during the colonial period. Akkadian tablets from the late Bronze Age (c. 1750 BC) attest to ice houses on the Euphrates River built for storing ice collected in winter from the snowy mountains for use in summer drinks. The Russians collected ice along the Neva River during the winter months for consumption in Saint Petersburg for many years. Wealthy Europeans began to build ice houses to store ice gathered on their local estates during the winter from the 16th century onwards; the ice was used to cool drinks or food.

Some techniques were also invented to produce ice or chilled drinks through more artificial means. In India, ice was imported from the Himalayas in the 17th century, but the expense of this meant that by the 19th century ice was instead produced in small quantities during the winter further south. Porous clay pots containing boiled, cooled water were laid out on top of straw in shallow trenches; under favourable circumstances, thin ice would form on the surface during winter nights which could be harvested and combined for sale. There were production sites at Hugli-Chuchura and Allahabad, but this "hoogly ice" was only available in limited amounts and considered of poor quality because it often resembled soft slush rather than hard crystals. Saltpeter and water were mixed together in India to cool drinks, taking advantage of local supplies of the chemical. In Europe, various chemical means for cooling drinks were created by the 19th century; these typically used sulphuric acid to chill the liquid, but were not capable of producing actual ice.

=== Opening up the trade, 1800–1830 ===
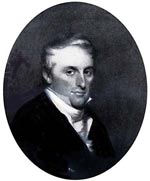
Frederic Tudor, the founder of the ice trade

The ice trade began in 1806 as the result of the efforts of Frederic Tudor, a New England entrepreneur, to export ice on a commercial basis. In New England, ice was an expensive product, consumed only by the wealthy who could afford their own ice houses. Nonetheless, icehouses were relatively common amongst the wealthier members of society by 1800, filled with ice cut, or harvested, from the frozen surface of ponds and streams on their local estates during the winter months.

Around the neighboring New York City area, the hot summers and rapidly growing economy had begun to increase local demand for ice towards the end of the 18th century, creating a small-scale market amongst farmers who sold ice from their ponds and streams to local city institutions and families. Some ships occasionally transported ice from New York and Philadelphia for sale to the southern U.S. states, in particular Charleston in South Carolina, laying it down as ballast on the trip.

Tudor's plan was to export ice as a luxury good to wealthy members of West Indies and the southern U.S. states, where he hoped they would relish the product during their sweltering summers; conscious of the risk that others might follow suit, Tudor hoped to acquire local monopoly rights in his new markets in order to maintain high prices and profits. He started by attempting to establish a monopoly on the potential ice trade in the Caribbean and invested in a brigantine ship to transport ice bought from farmers around Boston. At the time, Tudor was regarded by the business community at best as something of an eccentric, and at worst a fool.

The first shipments took place in 1806 when Tudor transported an initial trial cargo of ice, probably harvested from his family estate at Rockwood, to the Caribbean island of Martinique. Sales were hampered, however, by the lack of local storage facilities, both for Tudor's stock and any ice bought by domestic customers, and as a result the ice stocks quickly melted away. Learning from this experience, Tudor then built a functioning ice depot in Havana and, despite the U.S. trade embargo declared in 1807, was trading successfully again by 1810. He was unable to acquire exclusive legal rights to import ice into Cuba, but was nonetheless able to maintain an effective monopoly through his control of the ice houses. The 1812 war briefly disrupted trade, but over subsequent years Tudor began to export fruit back from Havana to the mainland on the return journey, kept fresh with part of the unsold ice cargo. Trade to Charleston and to Savannah in Georgia followed, while Tudor's competitors began to supply South Carolina and Georgia by ship from New York or using barges sent downstream from Kentucky.

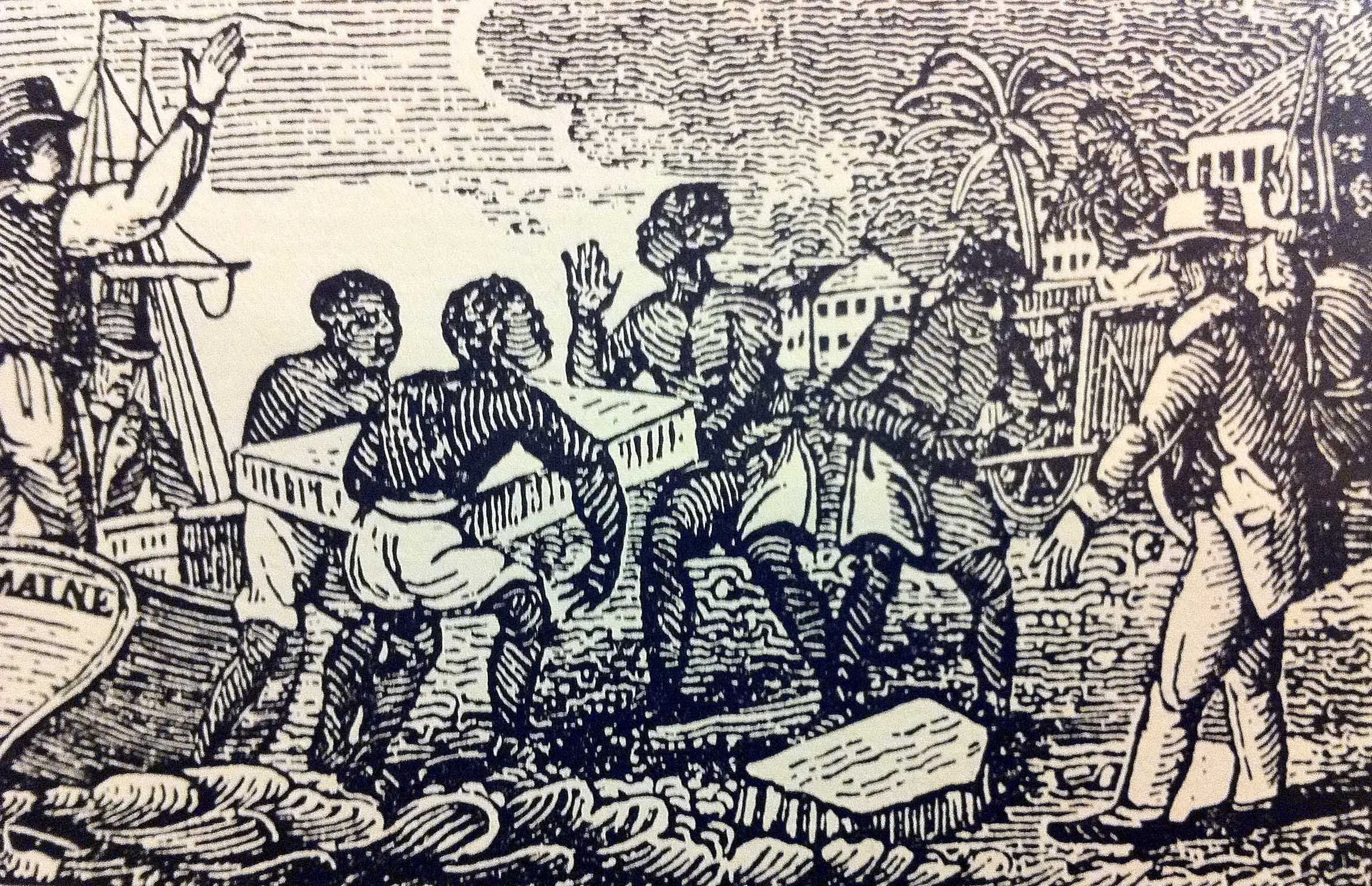
Spanish slaves in Cuba unloading ice from Maine

The price of the imported ice varied according to the amount of competition; in Havana, Tudor's ice sold for 25 cents ($3.70 in 2010) per pound, while in Georgia it reached only six to eight cents ($0.90–$1.20 in 2010). Where Tudor had a strong market share, he would respond to competition from passing traders by lowering his prices considerably, selling his ice at the unprofitable rate of one cent ($0.20) per pound (0.5 kg); at this price, competitors would typically be unable to sell their own stock at a profit: they would either be driven into debt or if they declined to sell, their ice would melt away in the heat. Tudor, relying on his local storage depots, could then increase his prices once again. By the middle of the 1820s, around 3,000 tons (3 million kg) of ice was being shipped from Boston annually, two thirds by Tudor.

At these lower prices, ice began to sell in considerable volumes, with the market moving beyond the wealthy elite to a wider range of consumers, to the point where supplies became overstretched. Ice was also being used by tradesmen to preserve perishable goods, rather than for direct consumption. Tudor looked beyond his existing suppliers to Maine and even to harvesting from passing icebergs, but neither source proved practical. Instead, Tudor teamed up with Nathaniel Wyeth to take advantage of the ice supplies of Boston on an industrial scale. Wyeth created a new form of horse-pulled ice-cutter in 1825 that cut square blocks of ice more efficiently than previous methods. He agreed to supply Tudor from Fresh Pond in Cambridge, Massachusetts, reducing the cost of harvesting ice from 30 cents ($7.30) a ton (901 kg) to only 10 cents ($2.40). Sawdust to insulate the ice was brought from Maine, at $16,000 ($390,000) a year.

=== Expansion, 1830–1850 ===
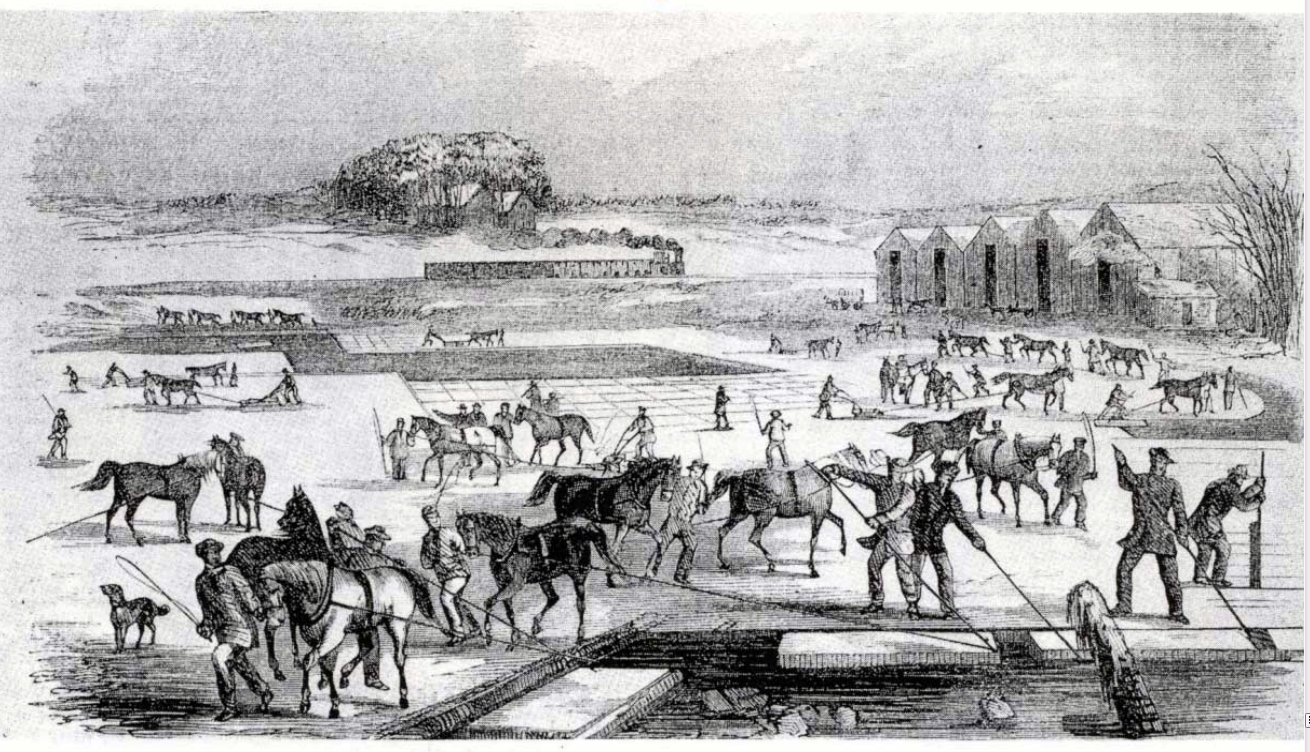
Ice harvesting at Spy Pond, Arlington, Massachusetts, 1852, showing the railroad line in the background, used to transport the ice

The trade in New England ice expanded during the 1830s and 1840s across the eastern coast of the U.S., while new trade routes were created across the world. The first and most profitable of these new routes was to India: in 1833 Tudor combined with the businessmen Samuel Austin and William Rogers to attempt to export ice to Calcutta using the brigantine ship the Tuscany.

The Anglo-Indian elite, concerned about the effects of the summer heat, quickly agreed to exempt the imports from the usual East India Company regulations and trade tariffs, and the initial net shipment of around a hundred tons (90,000 kg) sold successfully. With the ice selling for three pence (£0.80 in 2010) per pound (0.45 kg), the first shipment aboard the Tuscany produced profits of $9,900 ($253,000), and in 1835 Tudor commenced regular exports to Calcutta, Madras, and Bombay. (Note: Tudor was driven to turn to the ice trade with India following his colossal losses investing in the coffee futures market; faced with bankruptcy, he convinced his creditors to allow him to continue trading in a bid to pay off his debts, and turned to fresh markets to bring in revenue.)

Tudor's competitors soon entered the market as well, shipping ice by sea to both Calcutta and Bombay, further increasing competition and driving out most of the indigenous ice dealers. A grand ice house was built from stone in Calcutta by the local British community to store the ice imports. Small shipments of chilled fruit and dairy products began to be sent out with the ice, bringing high prices. Attempts were made by Italian traders to introduce ice from the Alps into Calcutta, but Tudor repeated his monopolistic techniques from the Caribbean, driving them and many others out of the market. Calcutta remained a particularly profitable market for ice for many years; Tudor alone made more than $220,000 ($4,700,000) in profits between 1833 and 1850.

Other new markets were to follow. In 1834 Tudor sent shipments of ice to Brazil along with chilled apples, beginning the ice trade with Rio de Janeiro. These ships typically returned to North America carrying cargoes of sugar, fruit and, later, cotton. Ice from traders in New England reached Sydney, Australia, in 1839, initially selling at three pence (£0.70) per pound (0.5 kg), later rising to six pence (£1.40). This trade was to prove less regular, and the next shipments arrived in the 1840s. The export of chilled vegetables, fish, butter, and eggs to the Caribbean and to markets in the Pacific grew during the 1840s, with as many as 35 barrels being transported on a single ship, alongside a cargo of ice. Shipments of New England ice were sent as far as Hong Kong, South-East Asia, the Philippines, the Persian Gulf, New Zealand, Argentina and Peru.

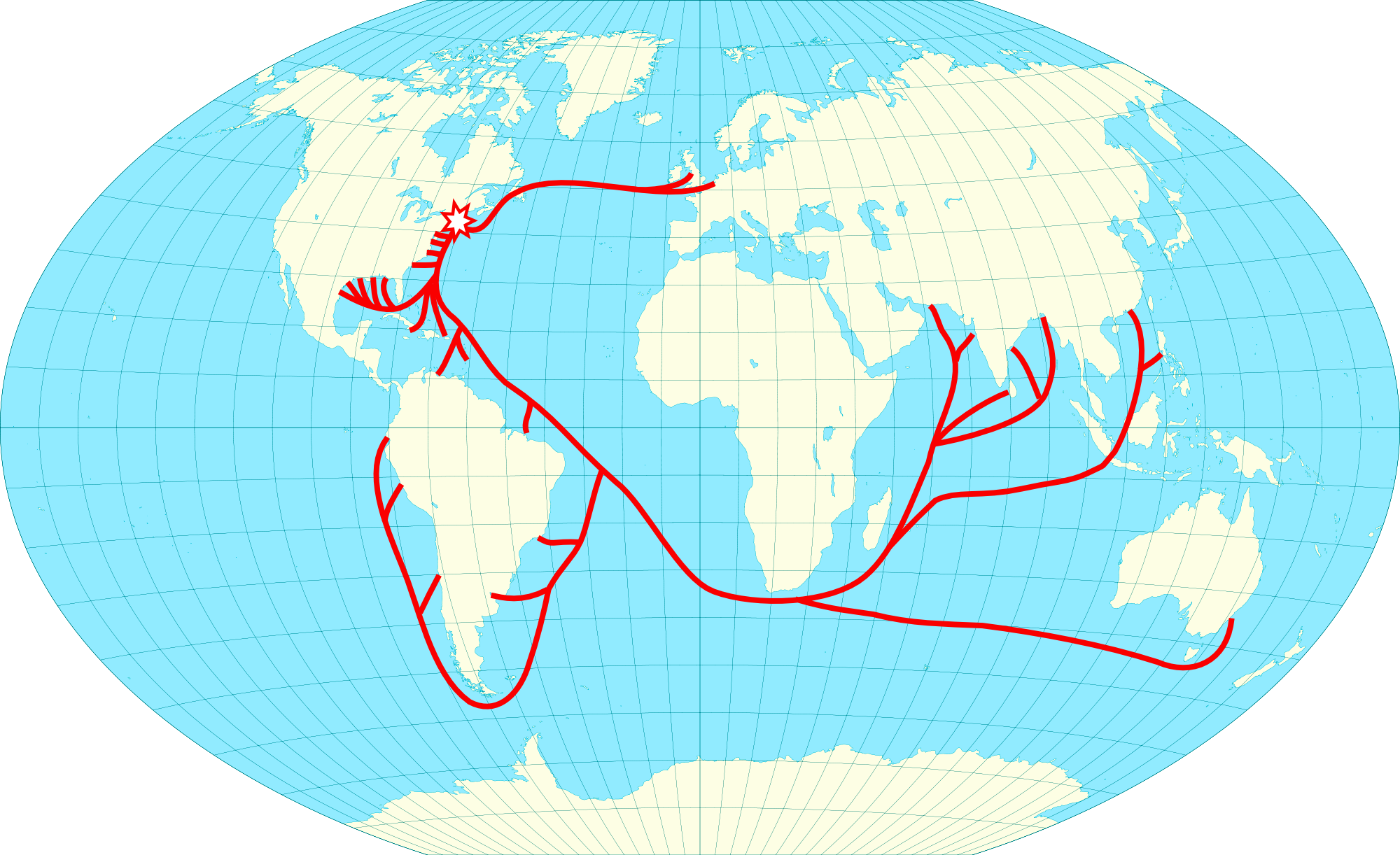
The growth of the New England ice trade by 1856; star indicates New England

New England businessmen also tried to establish a market for ice in England during the 1840s. An abortive first attempt to export ice to England had occurred in 1822 under William Leftwich; he had imported ice from Norway, but his cargo had melted before reaching London. Fresh attempts were made by Jacob Hittinger, who owned supplies at Fresh Pond, and Eric Landor, with assets at Wenham Lake, in 1842 and 1844 respectively. Of the two, Landor's venture was more successful and he formed the Wenham Lake Ice Company to export to Britain, building an ice depot on the Strand. Wenham ice was marketed as being unusually pure, possessed of special cooling properties, successfully convincing British customers to avoid local British ice, which was condemned as polluted and unhealthy.

After some initial success, the venture eventually failed, in part because the English chose not to adopt chilled drinks in the same way as North Americans, but also because of the long distances involved in the trade and the consequent costs of ice wastage through melting. Nonetheless, the trade allowed for some refrigerated goods to arrive in England from America along with ice cargoes during the 1840s. (Note: The 19th century novelist William Thackeray satirically used Wenham ice in his 1856 story A Little Dinner at Timmins, citing it as a boring fad that had come to dominate London dinner parties.)

The east coast of the U.S. also began to consume more ice, particularly as more industrial and private customers found uses for refrigeration. Ice became increasingly used in the northeast of the U.S. to preserve dairy products and fresh fruit for market, the chilled goods being transported over the growing railroad lines. By the 1840s, ice was being used to transfer small quantities of goods further west across the continent. Eastern U.S. fishermen began to use ice to preserve their catches. Fewer businesses or individuals in the east harvested their own ice, most preferring to rely on commercial providers.

With this growth in commerce, Tudor's initial monopoly on the trade broke down, but he continued to make significant profits from the growing trade. Increased supplies of ice were also needed to keep up with demand. From 1842 onwards, Tudor and others invested at Walden Pond in New England for additional supplies. New companies began to spring up, such as the Philadelphia Ice Company, which made use of the new railroad lines to transport harvested ice, while the Kershow family introduced improved ice harvesting to the New York region.

=== Growth westwards, 1850–1860 ===
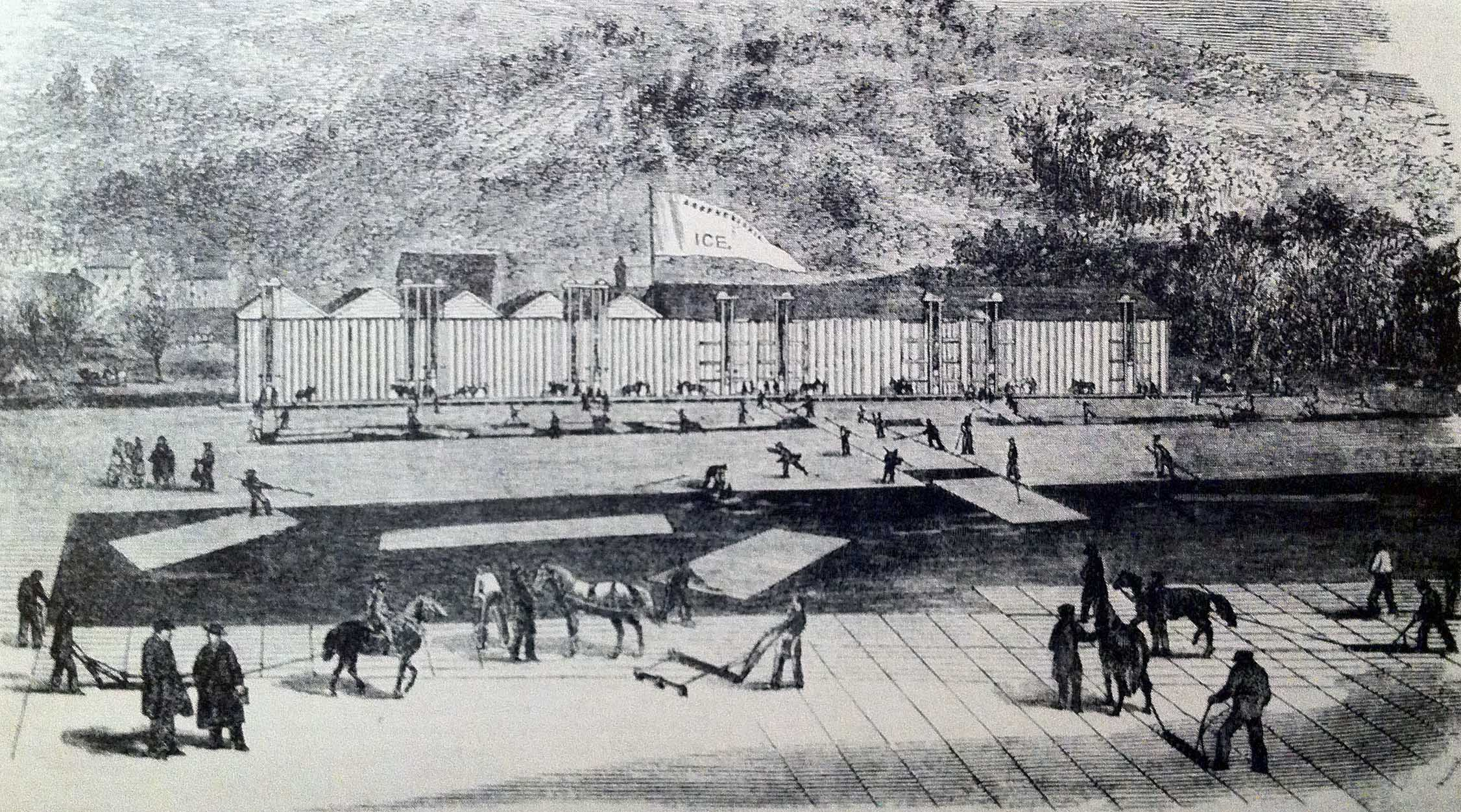
Harvesting ice near New York City, 1852, showing the vertical lifts used to fill the ice house

The 1850s was a period of transition for the ice trade. The industry was already quite large: in 1855 around $6–7 million ($118–138 million in 2010) was invested in the industry in the U.S., and an estimated two million tons (two billion kg) of ice was kept in storage at any time in warehouses across the nation. Over the coming decade, however, the focus of the growing trade shifted away from relying upon the international export market in favour of supplying first the growing, eastern cities of the U.S., and then the rest of the rapidly expanding country.

In 1850, California was in the midst of a gold rush; backed by this sudden demand for luxuries, New England companies made the first shipments, by ship to San Francisco and Sacramento, in California, including a shipment of refrigerated apples. The market was proved, but shipping ice in this way was expensive and demand outstripped supply. Ice began to be ordered instead from the then Russian-controlled Alaska in 1851 at $75 a ton (901 kg). The American-Russian Commercial Company was subsequently formed in San Francisco in 1853 to work in partnership with the Russian-American Company of Alaska to supply ice to the west coast of America. The Russian company trained Aleutian teams to harvest ice in Alaska, built sawmills to produce insulating sawdust and shipped the ice south along with supplies of chilled fish. The costs of this operation remained high, and M. Tallman founded the rival Nevada Ice Company, which harvested ice on Pilot Creek and transported to Sacramento, bringing the west coast price for ice down to seven cents ($2) a pound (0.5 kg). (Note: It is possible that the contracts were also linked to attempts to avoid Alaska falling into British hands during the Crimean War.)

The U.S. was expanding westwards, and, in Ohio, Hiram Joy began to exploit Crystal Lake, near Chicago, which was soon linked to the city by the Chicago, St Paul and Fond du Lac Railroad. The ice was used to allow goods to be brought to market. Cincinnati and Chicago began to use ice to help the packing of pork in the summer; John L. Schooley developing the first refrigerated packing room. Fruit began to be stored in central Illinois using refrigerators, for consumption in later seasons. By the 1860s, ice was being used to allow the brewing of the increasingly popular lager beer all year round. Improved railroad links helped the growth in business across the region and to the east.

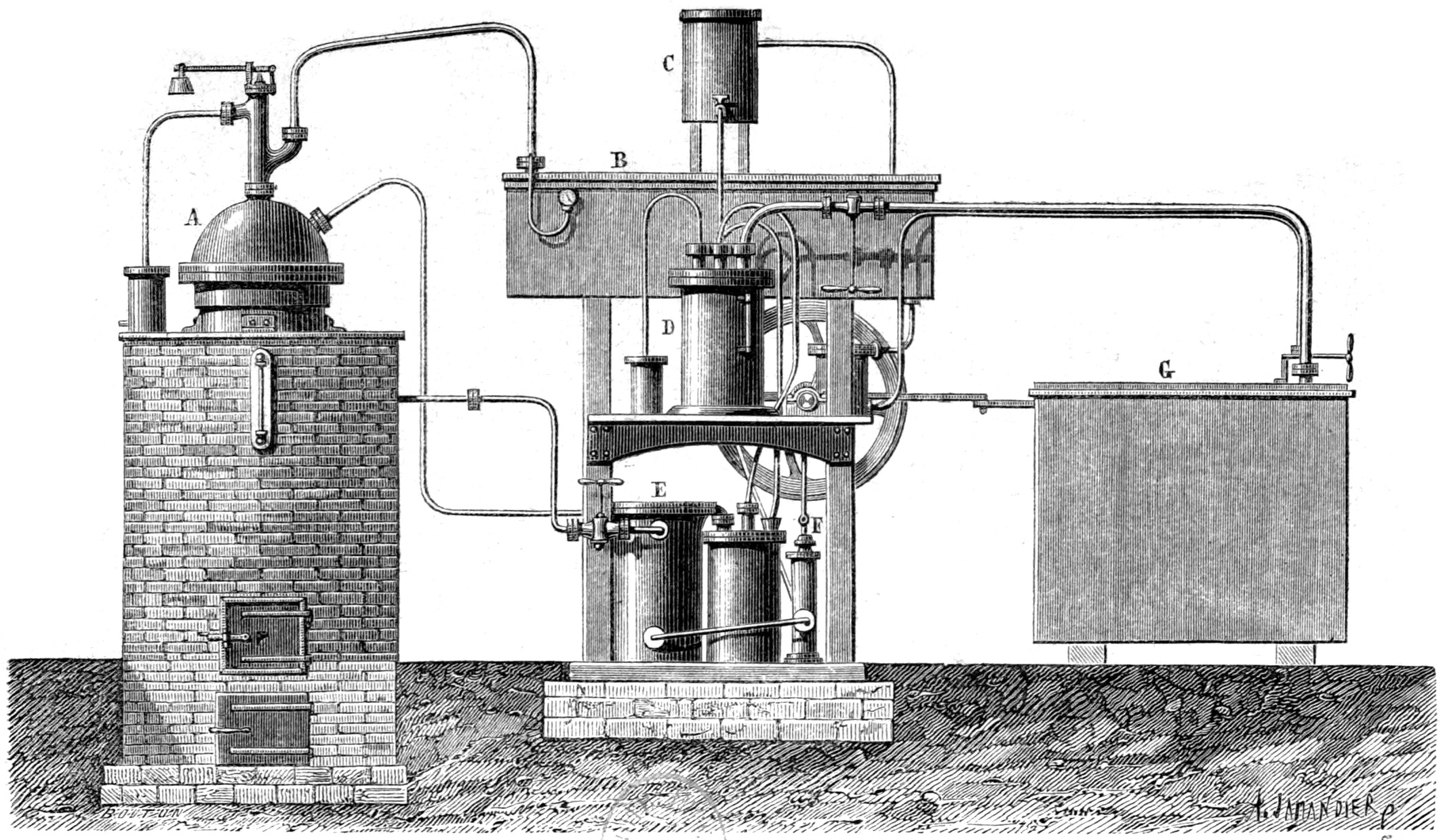
An early Ferdinand Carré ice plant machine

Meanwhile, it had been known since 1748 that it was possible to artificially chill water with mechanical equipment, and attempts were made in the late 1850s to produce artificial ice on a commercial scale. Various methods had been invented to do this, including Jacob Perkins's diethyl ether vapor-compression refrigeration engine, invented in 1834; engines that used pre-compressed air; John Gorrie's air cycle engines; and ammonia-based approaches such as those championed by Ferdinand Carré and Charles Tellier. The resulting product was variously called plant or artificial ice, but there were numerous obstacles to manufacturing it commercially. Producing plant ice required large amounts of fuel, in the form of coal, and capital for machinery, so producing ice at a competitive price was challenging. The early technology was unreliable, and for many decades ice plants faced the risk of explosions and consequent damage to the surrounding buildings. Ammonia-based approaches potentially left hazardous ammonia in the ice, into which it had leaked through the joints of machinery. For most of the 19th century, plant ice was not as clear as much natural ice, sometimes left white residue when it melted and was generally regarded as less suitable for human consumption than the natural product.

Nonetheless, Alexander Twining and James Harrison set up ice plants in Ohio and Melbourne respectively during the 1850s, both using Perkins engines. Twining found he could not compete with natural ice, but in Melbourne Harrison's plant came to dominate the market. Australia's distance from New England, where journeys could take 115 days, and the consequent high level of wastage – 150 tons of the first 400-ton shipment to Sydney melted en route – made it relatively easy for plant ice to compete with the natural product. Elsewhere, however, natural ice dominated the entire market.

=== Expansion and competition, 1860–1880 ===
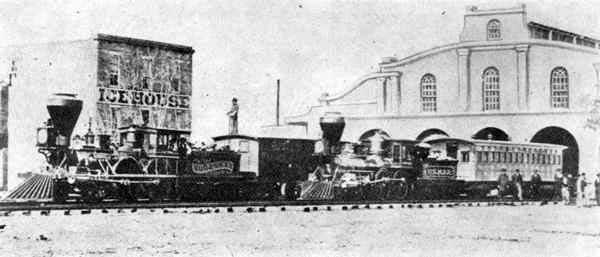
An ice house and neighboring railroad line in Algiers, Louisiana, 1865

The international ice trade continued through the second half of the 19th century, but it increasingly moved away from its former, New England roots. Indeed, ice exports from the U.S. peaked around 1870, when 65,802 tons (59,288,000 kg), worth $267,702 ($4,610,000 in 2010), were shipped out from the ports.

One factor in this was the slow spread of plant ice into India. Exports from New England to India peaked in 1856, when 146,000 tons (132 million kg) were shipped, and the Indian natural ice market faltered during the Indian Rebellion of 1857, dipped again during the American Civil War, and imports of ice slowly declined through the 1860s. Spurred on by the introduction of artificial ice plants around the world by the British Royal Navy, the International Ice Company was founded in Madras in 1874 and the Bengal Ice Company in 1878. Operating together as the Calcutta Ice Association, they rapidly drove natural ice out of the market.

An ice trade also developed in Europe. By the 1870s hundreds of men were employed to cut ice from the glaciers at Grindelwald in Switzerland, and Paris in France began to import ice from the rest of Europe in 1869. Meanwhile, Norway entered the international ice trade, focusing on exports to England. The first shipments from Norway to England had occurred in 1822, but larger-scale exports did not occur until the 1850s. The ice harvesting was initially centred on the fjords of the west coast, but poor local transport links pushed the trade south and east to the main centres of the Norwegian timber and shipping industries, both essential for ice exporting.

In the early 1860s, Lake Oppegård in Norway was renamed "Wenham Lake" with the aim of confusing the product with New England exports, and exports to England increased. Initially these were run by British business interests, but eventually transitioned to Norwegian companies. Distribution of the Norwegian ice across Britain was helped by the growing railway networks, while the railway connection built between the fishing port of Grimsby and London in 1853 created a demand for ice to allow the transport of fresh fish to the capital.

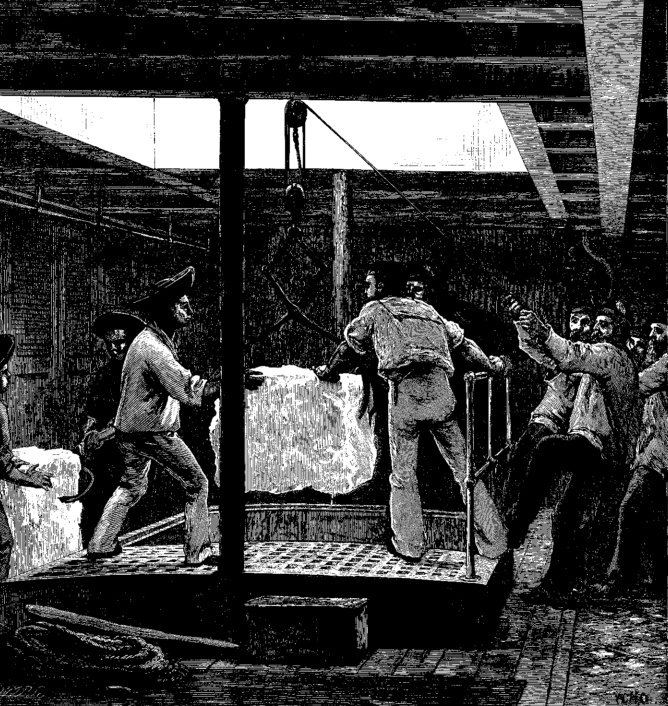
Taking on ice on HMS Serapis prior to her journey to India, 1875

The eastern market for ice in the U.S. was also changing. Cities like New York, Baltimore and Philadelphia saw their population boom in the second half of the century; New York tripled in size between 1850 and 1890, for example. This drove up the demand for ice considerably across the region. By 1879, householders in the eastern cities were consuming two thirds of a ton (601 kg) of ice a year, being charged 40 cents ($9.30) per 100 pounds (45 kg); 1,500 wagons were needed just to deliver ice to consumers in New York.

In supplying this demand, the ice trade increasingly shifted north, away from Massachusetts and towards Maine. Various factors contributed to this. New Englands' winters became warmer during the 19th century, while industrialisation resulted in more of the natural ponds and rivers becoming contaminated. Less trade was brought through New England as other ways of reaching western U.S. markets were opened up, making it less profitable to trade ice from Boston, while the cost of producing ships in the region increased due to deforestation. Finally, in 1860 there was the first of four ice famines along the Hudson-warm winters that prevented the formation of ice in New England-creating shortages and driving up prices.

The outbreak of the American Civil War in 1861 between the U.S. and its Southern states also contributed to the trend. The war disrupted the sale of Northern ice to the South, and Maine merchants instead turned to supplying the Union Army, whose forces used ice in their more southern campaigns. James L. Cheeseman had responded to the 1860 ice famine by moving his ice-trading business from the Hudson northwards into Maine, bringing with him the latest technology and techniques; Cheeseman went on to win valuable contracts with the Union Army during the war years. Carré ice machines were brought into New Orleans to make up the shortfall in the South, focusing in particular on supplying Southern hospitals. In the post-war years, the number of such plants increased, but once competition from the North recommenced, cheaper natural ice initially made it hard for the manufacturers to make a profit. By the late 1870s, however, efficiency improvements were allowing them to squeeze natural ice out of the marketplace in the South.

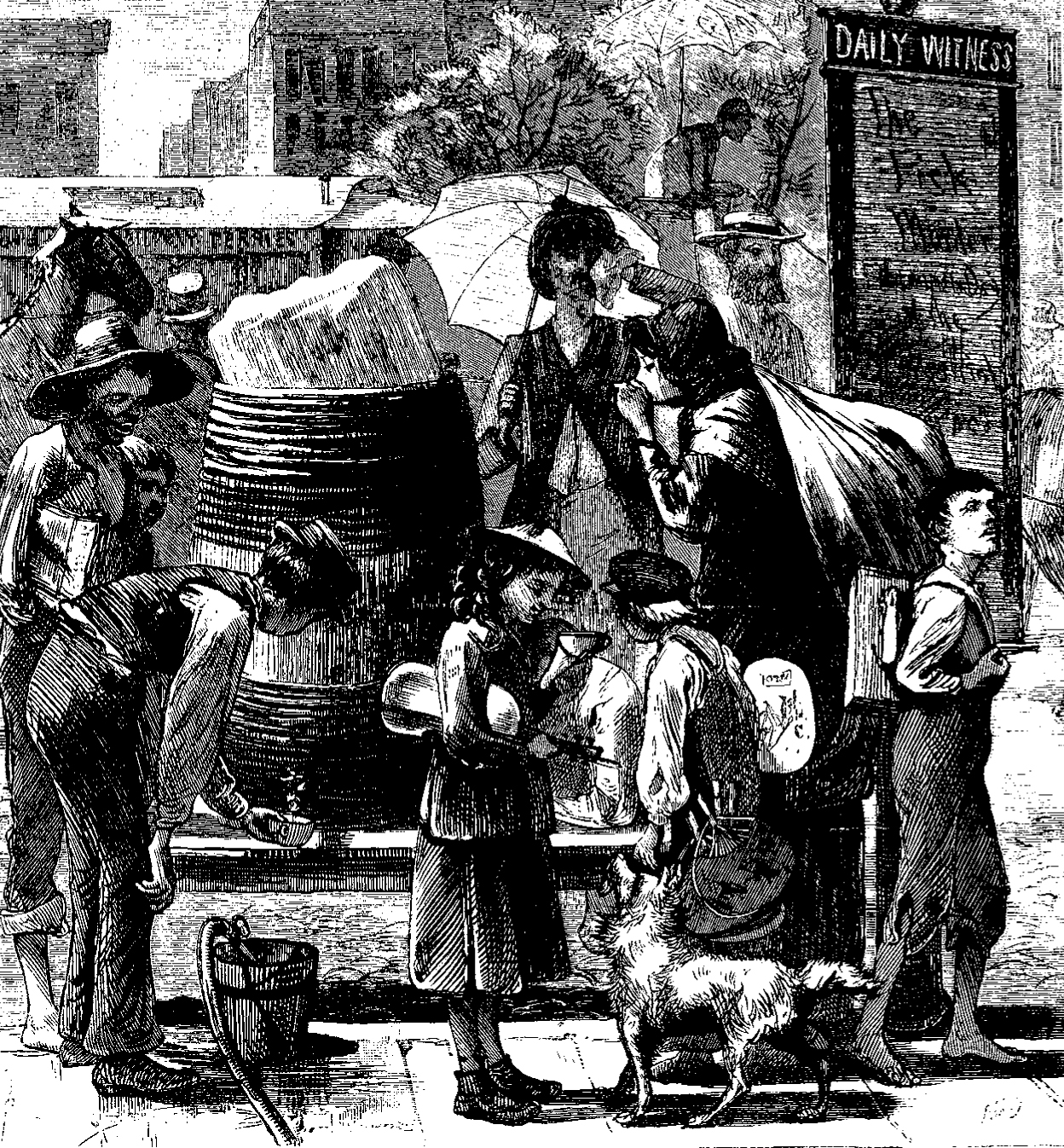
Iced water being distributed from a barrel, 1872

Another ice famine in 1870 then impacted both Boston and the Hudson, with a further famine following in 1880; as a result entrepreneurs descended on the Kennebec River in Maine as an alternative source. The Kennebec, along with the Penboscot and Sheepscot, was widely opened up for the ice industry, becoming an important source, particularly in warm winters, for the rest of the 19th century.

By the 1860s, natural ice was increasingly being used to move western American products to the east, starting with chilled meat from Chicago. There was some initial opposition, both from the cattle-car owners and from eastern butchers, who stood to lose out from the trade; by the 1870s, however, multiple shipments were leaving for the east each day. Chilled butter from the mid-West was then shipped onwards from New York to Europe, and by the 1870s 15 per cent of the United Kingdom's butter consumption was being met in this way. A chain of icing stations at Chicago, Omaha, Utah and Sierra Nevada allowed railroad refrigerator cars to cross the continent. The ability of ice companies to ship their product by rail from the east proved the final straw for the Alaskan ice trade, which collapsed during the 1870s and 1880s in the face of the competition, destroying the local saw-mill industry in the process.

During the 1870s ice began to be used by Timothy Eastman, of the Bell Brothers firm, to transport American meat to Britain; the first shipment successfully arrived in 1875 and by the following year 9,888 tons (8,909,000 kg) of meat was shipped. The chilled meat was retailed through special warehouses and stores. There was concern in Britain that chilled American meat might flood the market and harm domestic farmers, but the exports continued. The rival Chicago-based meat firms of Armour and Swift entered the refrigerated meat transport market in the late 1870, establishing their own fleet of refrigerator cars, network of icing stations and other infrastructure, increasing the sales of chilled Chicago beef to the eastern seaboard from 15,680 tons (14,128,000 kg) a year in 1880, to 173,067 tons (155,933,000 kg) in 1884.

=== Peak of the trade, 1880–1900 ===
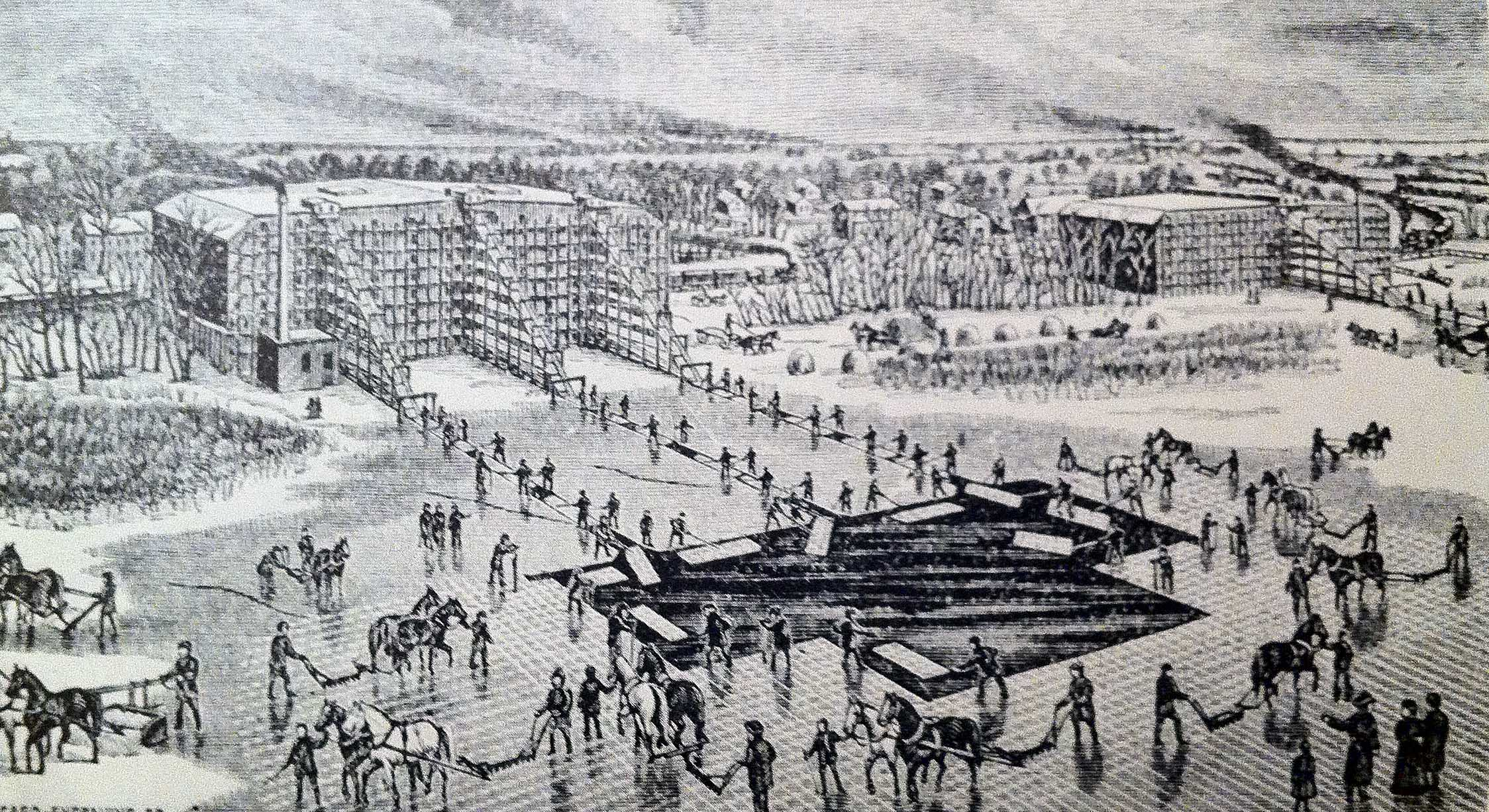
Harvesting ice at Wolf Lake, Indiana, in 1889, showing the conveyor belts used to lift the product into the ice house

Although the manufacture of artificial plant ice was still negligible in 1880, it began to grow in volume towards the end of the century as technological improvements finally allowed the production of plant ice at a competitive price. Typically ice plants first took hold in more distant locations where natural ice was at a cost disadvantage. The Australian and Indian markets were already dominated by plant ice, and ice plants began to be built in Brazil during the 1880s and 1890s, slowly coming to replace imported ice. In the U.S., plants began to become more numerous in the southern states. The long-distance transportation companies continued to use cheap natural ice for the bulk of their refrigeration needs, but they now used purchased local plant ice at key points across the U.S., to allow for surge demand and to avoid the need to hold reserve stocks of natural ice. After 1898 the British fishing industry, too, began to turn to plant ice to refrigerate its catches.

Plant technology began to be turned to the problem of directly chilling rooms and containers, to replace the need to carry ice at all. Pressure began to grow for a replacement for ice bunkers on the trans-Atlantic routes during the 1870s. Tellier produced a chilled storeroom for the steamship Le Frigorifique, using it to ship beef from Argentina to France, while the Glasgow-based firm of Bells helped to sponsor a new, compressed-air chiller for ships using the Gorrie approach, called the Bell-Coleman design. These technologies soon became used on the trade to Australia, New Zealand and Argentina. The same approach began to be taken in other industries. Carl von Linde found ways of applying mechanical refrigeration to the brewing industry, removing its reliance on natural ice; cold warehouses and meat packers began to rely on chilling plants.

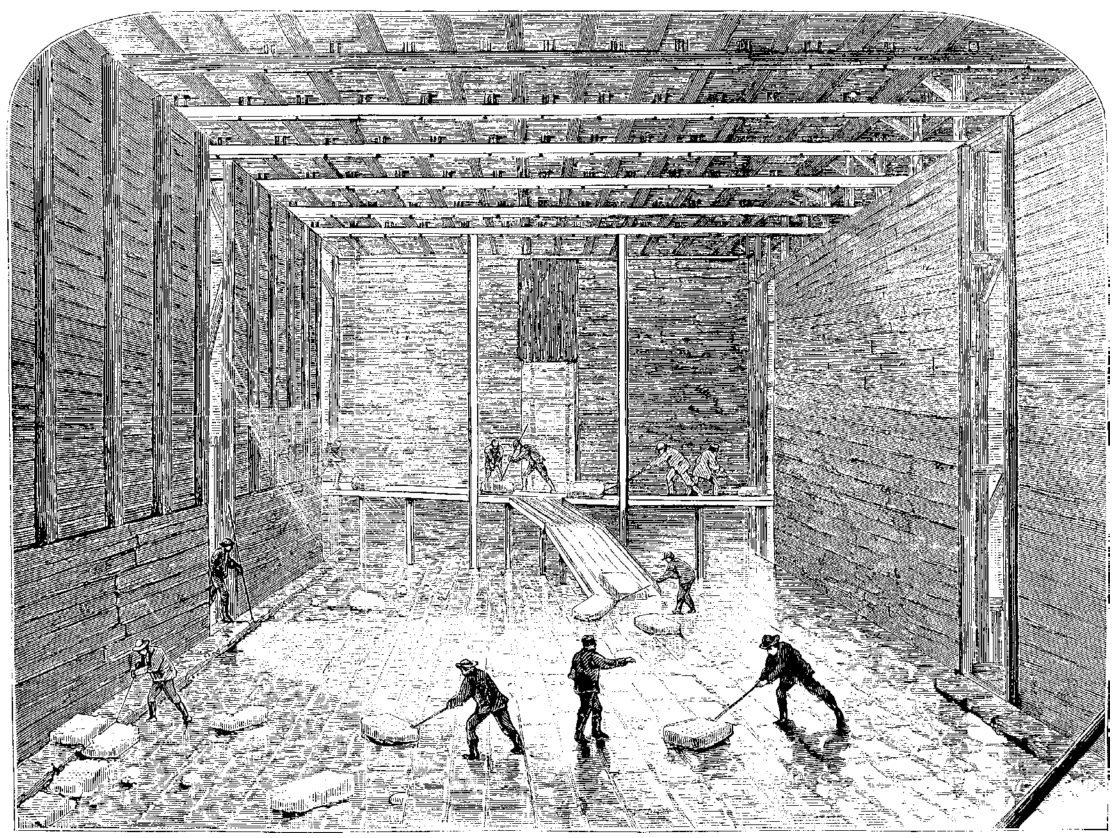
Ice being stacked inside a warehouse at Barrytown on the Hudson River

Despite this emerging competition, natural ice remained vital to North American and European economies, with demand driven up by rising living standards. The huge demand for ice in the 1880s drove the natural ice trade to continue to expand. Around four million tons (four billion kg) of ice was routinely stored along the Hudson River and Maine alone, the Hudson having around 135 major warehouses along its banks and employing 20,000 workers. Firms expanded along the Kennebec River in Maine to meet the demand, and 1,735 vessels were required in 1880 to carry the ice south. Lakes in Wisconsin began to be put into production to supply the Midwest. 1890 saw another ice famine hit the east: the Hudson harvests failed entirely, causing a sudden rush by entrepreneurs to establish operations in Maine, where ice had successfully formed. Unfortunately for investors, the following summer was quite cool, suppressing demand for stocks, and many businessmen were ruined. Across the U.S., an estimated 90,000 people and 25,000 horses involved in a trade capitalised at $28 million ($660 million in 2010).

The Norwegian trade peaked during the 1890s, with a million tons (900 million kg) of ice being exported from Norway by 1900; the major Leftwich company in Britain, importing much of this, kept a thousand tons (900,000 kg) of ice in store at all times to meet demand. Austria entered the European ice market behind Norway, with the Vienna Ice Company exporting natural ice to Germany by the end of the century.

There was considerable conglomeration in the U.S. ice trade towards the end of the century, and foreign competitors, such as Norway, complained of U.S. collusion. Charles W. Morse was a businessman from Maine who by 1890 had used questionable financial processes to acquire control of the New York City Ice Company and the Consumers' Ice Company of New York, merging them into the Consolidated Ice Company. In turn Morse bought out his major competitor, the Knickerbocker Ice Company of New York, in 1896, giving him control of around four million tons (four billion kg) of the regional ice harvests each year. Morse incorporated his few remaining rivals into the American Ice Company in 1899, giving him control of all of the natural and plant ice supplies and distribution in the north-east of the U.S. On the west coast, Edward Hopkins formed the Union Ice Company in San Francisco, bringing together a range of regional ice companies to produce another huge ice company. In contrast, the competition in the British market remained harsh, keeping prices relatively low.

=== End of the trade, 20th century ===
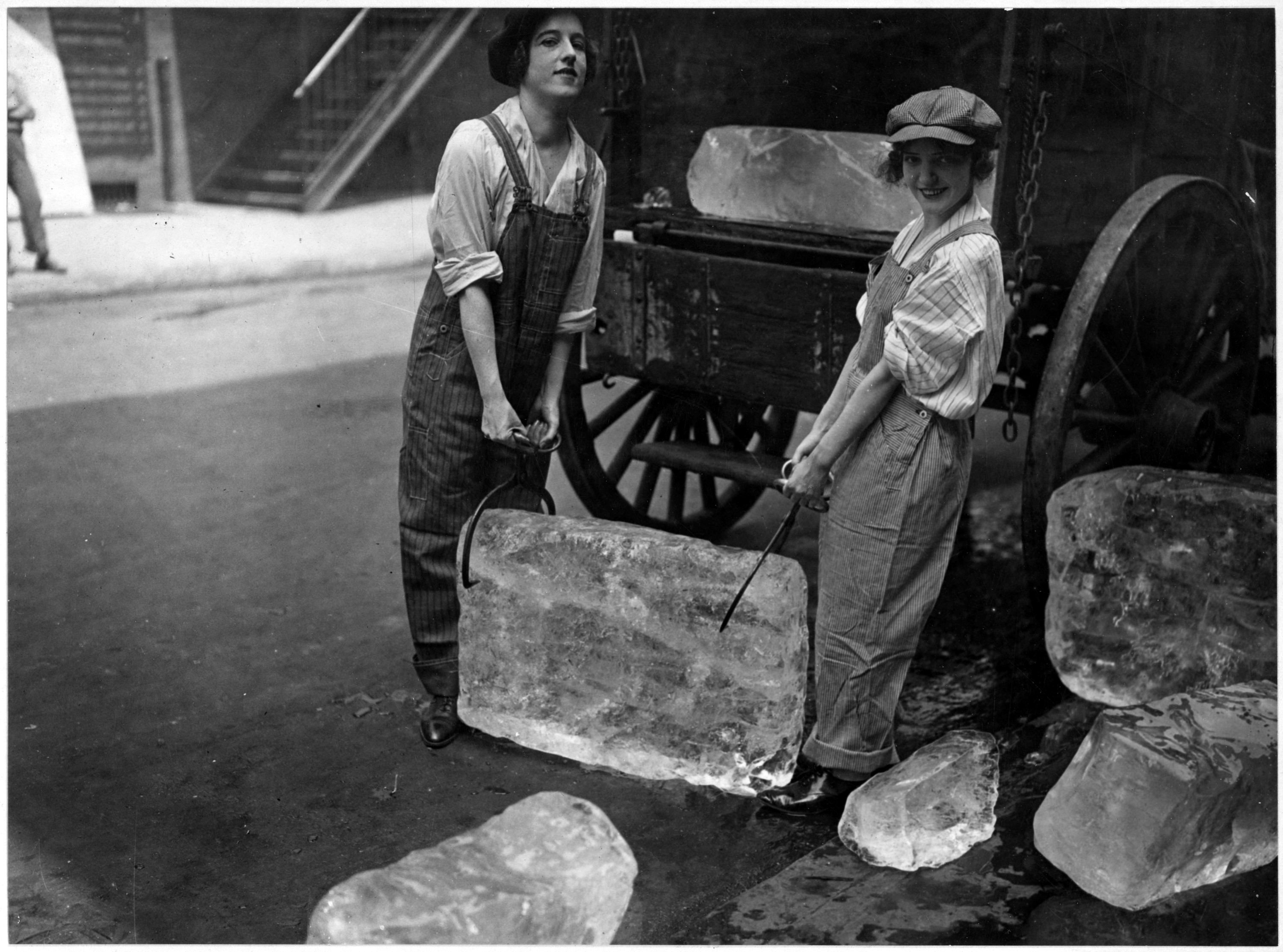
Women delivering ice in World War I from an ice wagon, during the final surge in the ice trade

The natural ice trade was rapidly supplanted by refrigeration cooling systems and plant ice during the early years of the 20th century. Plant ice production in New York doubled between 1900 and 1910 and, by 1914, 26 million tons (23 billion kg) of plant ice was being produced in the U.S. each year in comparison to the 24 million tons (22 billion kg) of naturally harvested ice. There was a similar trend around the world – Britain had 103 ice plants by 1900, for example – and this made it increasingly unprofitable to import ice from the U.S.; annual imports of ice fell to less than 15,000 tons (13 million kg) by 1910. This was reflected in trade publications changing their names: the Ice Trade Journal, for example, retitled itself the Refrigerating World.

The trend toward artificial ice was hastened by the regular ice famines during the period, such as the 1898 British famine, which typically caused rapid price increases, fuelled demand for plant ice and encouraged investment in the new technologies. Concerns also grew over the safety of natural ice. Initial reports concerning ice being produced from polluted or unclean lakes and rivers had first emerged in the U.S. as early as the 1870s. The British public health authorities believed Norwegian ice was generally much purer and safer than American sourced ice, but reports in 1904 noted the risk of contamination in transit and recommended moving to the use of plant ice. In 1907, New York specialists claimed ice from the Hudson River to be unsafe for consumption and potentially containing typhoid germs; the report was successfully challenged by the natural ice industry, but public opinion was turning against natural ice on safety grounds. These fears of contamination was often played on by artificial ice manufacturers in their advertising. Major damage was also done to the industry by fire, including a famous blaze at the American Ice Company facilities at Iceboro in 1910, which destroyed the buildings and the adjacent schooners, causing around $130,000 ($2,300,000 in 2010) of damage and crippling the Maine ice industry.

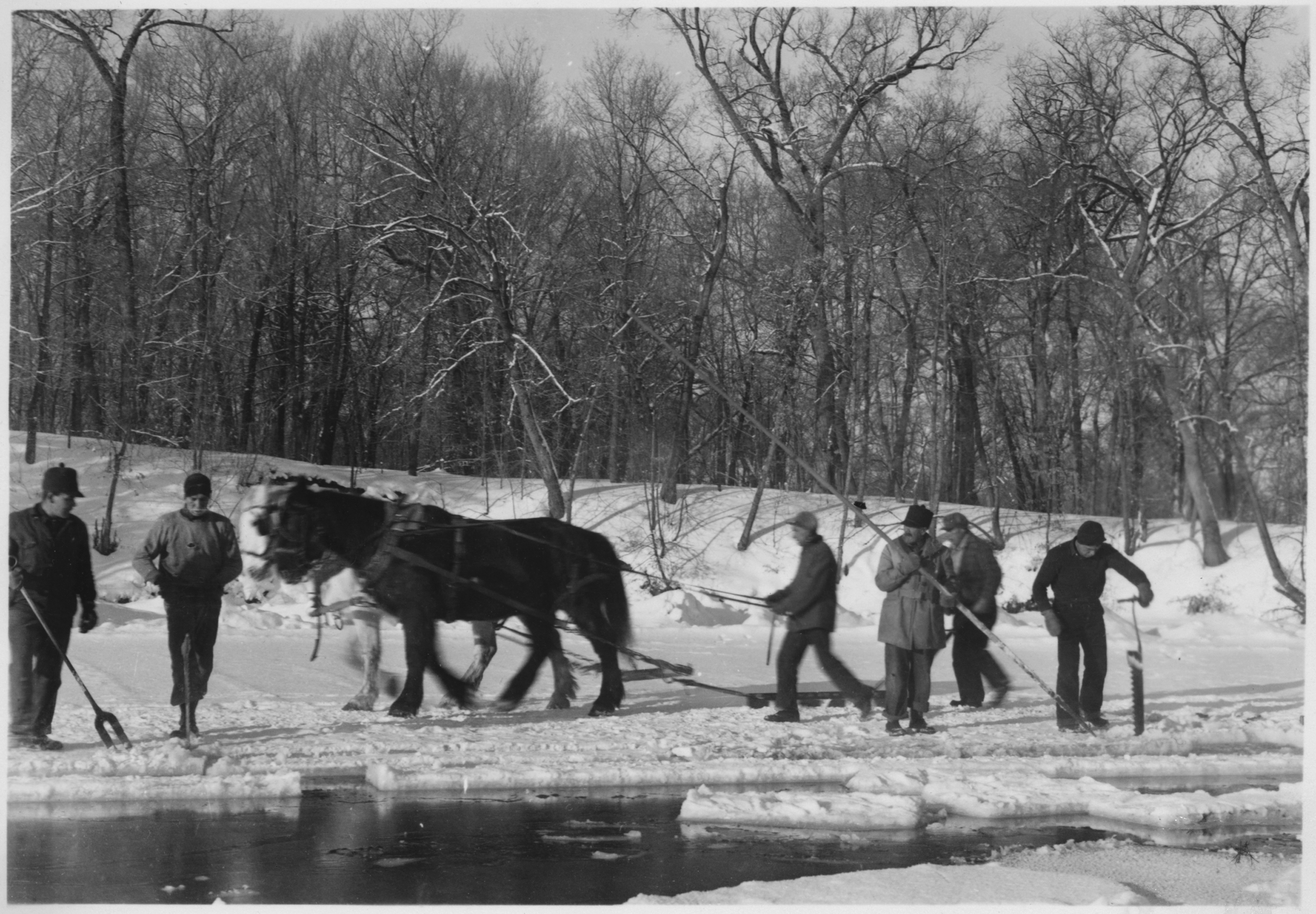
Ice-harvesting in Kansas following the end of the commercial trade, 1935 c. 1935

In response to this increasing competition, natural ice companies examined various options. Some invested in plant ice themselves. New tools were brought in to speed up the harvesting of ice, but these efficiency improvements were outstripped by technical advances in plant ice manufacture. The Natural Ice Association of America was formed to promote the benefits of natural ice, and companies played on the erroneous belief amongst customers that natural ice melted more slowly than manufactured ice. Under pressure, some ice companies attempted to exploit their local monopolies on ice distribution networks to artificially raise prices for urban customers. One of the most prominent cases of this involved Charles Morse and his American Ice Company, which suddenly almost tripled wholesale and doubled the retail prices in New York in 1900 in the midst of a heat wave; this created a scandal that caused Morse to sell up his assets in the ice trade altogether to escape prosecution, making a profit of $12 million ($320 million) in the process.

When the U.S. entered World War I in 1917, the American ice trade received a temporary boost to production. Shipments of chilled food to Europe surged during the war, placing significant demands on the country's existing refrigeration capabilities, while the need to produce munitions for the war effort meant that ammonia and coal for refrigeration plants were in short supply. The U.S. government worked together with the plant and natural ice industries to promote the use of natural ice to relieve the burden and maintain adequate supplies. For Britain and Norway, however, the war impacted badly on the natural ice trade; the German attempt to blockade the North Sea with U-boats made shipments difficult, and Britain relied increasingly more heavily on its limited number of ice plants for supplies instead.

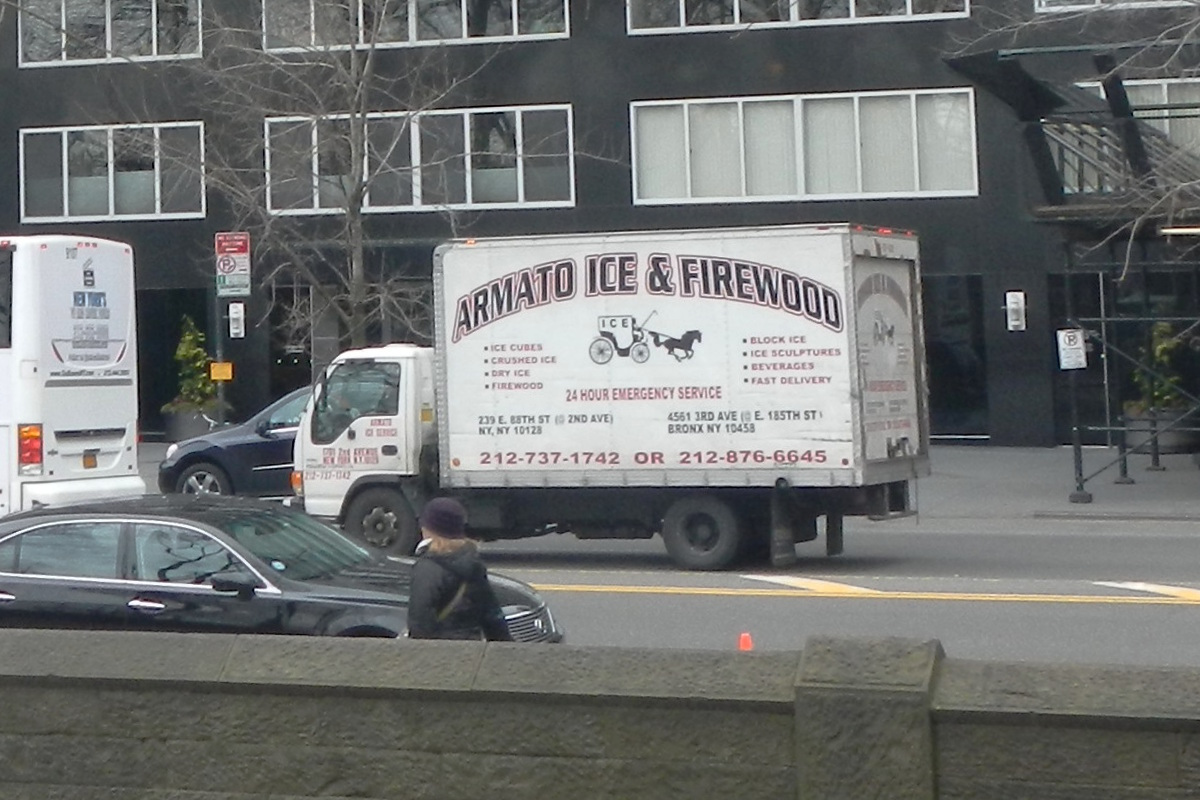
Manhattan ice truck, 2013

In the years after the war, the natural ice industry collapsed into insignificance. Industry turned entirely to plant ice and mechanical cooling systems, and the introduction of cheap electric motors resulted in domestic, modern refrigerators becoming common in U.S. homes by the 1930s and more widely across Europe in the 1950s, allowing ice to be made in the home. The natural ice harvests shrunk dramatically, and ice warehouses were abandoned or converted for other uses. The use of natural ice on a small scale lingered on in more remote areas for some years, and ice continued to be occasionally harvested for carving at artistic competitions and festivals, but by the end of the 20th century there were very few physical reminders of the trade.

== Supply ==
In order for natural ice to reach its customers, it had to be harvested from ponds and rivers, then transported and stored at various sites before finally being used in domestic or commercial applications. Throughout these processes, traders faced the problem of keeping the ice from melting; melted ice represented waste and lost profits. In the 1820s and 1830s only 10% of ice harvested was eventually sold to the end user due to wastage en route. By the end of the 19th century, however, the wastage in the ice trade was reduced to between 20% and 50%, depending on the efficiency of the company.

=== Harvesting ===
Film of the 1919 ice harvest in the Poconos

The ice trade started with the harvesting of ice from ponds and rivers during the winter, to be stored for the summer months ahead. Water freezes in this way once it falls to a temperature of 40 °F (5 °C) and the surrounding air temperature drops to 32 °F (0 °C). Ice needed to be at least 18 inches (0.46 m) thick to be harvested, as it needed to support the weight of the workers and horses and be suitable for cutting into large blocks. In New England, ponds and rivers typically had deep enough ice to harvest between January and March, while in Norway harvesting occurred between December and February. Natural ice could occur with different qualities; most prized was hard, clear crystal ice, typically consumed at the table; more porous, white-colored ice was less valuable and used by industry. With a good thickness of ice, around 1,000 tons (900,000 kg) could be harvested from an acre (0.4 hectares) of surface water.

Purely natural sources were insufficient in some areas and additional steps taken to increase supplies. In New England, holes were drilled in the ice to promote the thickening of the surface. Alternatively, artificial lakes were created in some areas, and guidance was published on how best to construct the dams that lay at the heart of these designs. Low-lying, boggy land was dammed and flooded in Maine towards the end of the century to meet surge demands, while pre-existing artificial mill ponds in Wisconsin turned out to be ideal for harvesting commercial ice. In Alaska, a large, shallow artificial lake covering around 40 acres (16 hectares) was produced in order to assist in ice production and harvesting; similar approaches were taken in the Aleutian islands; in Norway this was taken further, with a number of artificial lakes up to half a mile long built on farmland to increase supplies, including some built out into the sea to collect fresh water for ice.

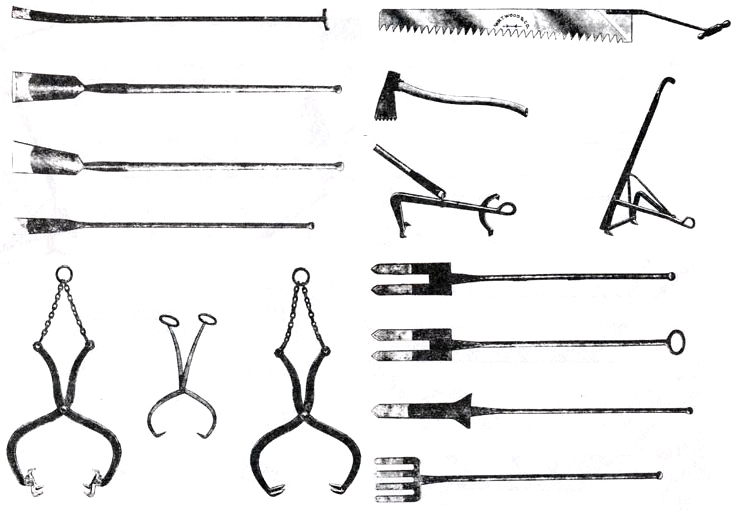
Selection of late 19th century specialist ice tools; clockwise from top left, chisels; ice saw, ice adze, grapples; bars; tongs

The ice-cutting involved several stages and was typically carried out at night, when the ice was thickest. First the surface would be cleaned of snow with scrapers, the depth of the ice tested for suitability, then the surface would be marked out with cutters to produce the lines of the future ice blocks. The size of the blocks varied according to the destination, the largest being for the furthest locations, the smallest destined for the American east coast itself and being only 22 inches (0.56 m) square. The blocks could finally be cut out of the ice and floated to the shore. The speed of the operation might depend on the likelihood of warmer weather affecting the ice. In both New England and Norway, harvesting occurred during an otherwise quiet season, providing valuable local employment.

The process required a range of equipment. Some of this was protective equipment to allow the workforce and horses to operate safely on ice, including cork shoes for the men and spiked horse shoes. Early in the 19th century only ad hoc, improvised tools such as pickaxes and chisels were used for the rest of the harvest, but in the 1840s Wyeth introduced various new designs to allow for a larger-scale, more commercial harvesting process. These included a horse-drawn ice cutter, resembling a plough with two parallel cutters to help in marking out the ice quickly and uniformly, and later a horse-drawn plough with teeth to assist in the cutting process itself, replacing the hand saw. By the 1850s, specialist ice tool manufacturers were producing catalogues and selling products along the east coast. There were discussions over the desirability of a circular cutting saw for much of the 19th century, but it proved impractical to power them with horses and they were not introduced to ice harvesting until the start of the 20th century, when gasoline engines became available.

A warm winter could cripple an ice harvest, however, either resulting in no ice at all, or thin ice that formed smaller blocks or that could not be harvested safely. These winters were called "open winters" in North America, and could result in shortages of ice, called ice famines. Famous ice famines in the U.S. included those in 1880 and 1890, while the mild winter of 1898 in Norway resulted in Britain having to seek additional supplies from Finland. Over time, the ice famines promoted the investment in plant ice production, ultimately undermining the ice trade.

=== Legalities ===
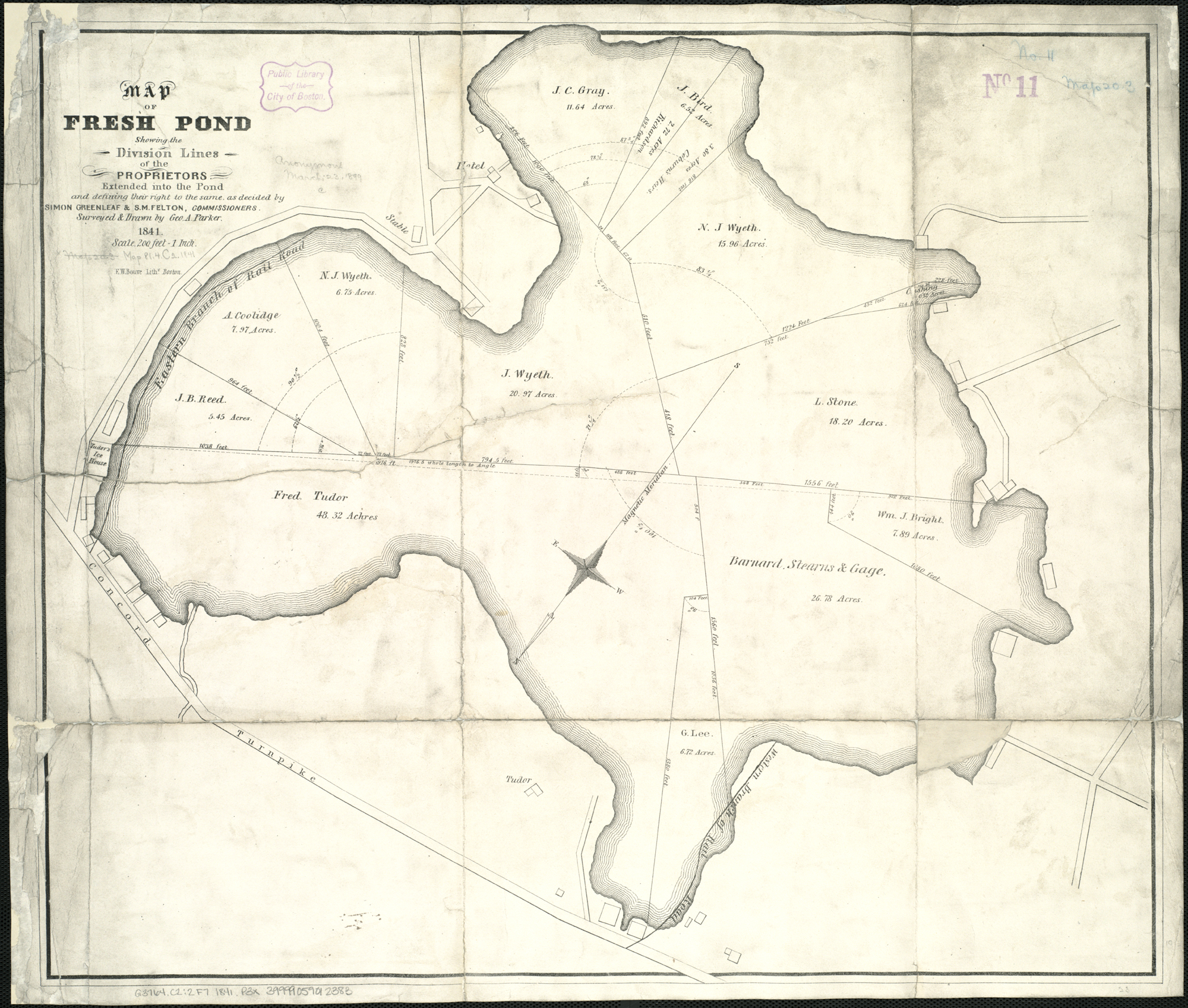
The 1841 map by Simon Greenleaf establishing the rights to ice from Fresh Pond, in Cambridge, Massachusetts

Early in the ice trade, there were few restrictions on harvesting ice in the U.S., as it had traditionally held little value and was seen as a free good. As the trade expanded, however, ice became valuable, and the right to cut ice became important. Legally, different rules were held to apply to navigable water ways, where the right to harvest the ice belonged to the first to stake a claim, and areas of "public" water such as streams or small lakes, where the ice was considered to belong to the neighboring land owners.

Many lakes had several land owners, however, and following disagreements over Fresh Pond, the lawyer Simon Greenleaf was charged to adjudicate a solution in 1841. Greenleaf decided that the right to harvest ice would be divided up in proportion with the amount of the shore line owned by the different claimants; from then onwards, the rights to harvest ice could be bought and sold and the value of land adjacent to sites such as Fresh Pond increased rapidly, with one owner who purchased land at $130 ($2,500 in 2010) an acre (0.4 hectares) in the 1820s refusing an offer of $2,000 ($44,000) an acre by the 1850s.

This judgment did not remove the potential for disputes, as ice could be washed downstream along rivers, resulting in arguments over the ownership of the displaced ice. In some states it was made illegal to damage the uncut ice belonging to another businessman, but arguments could still become nasty. In the winter of 1900–01, for example, disputes between the Pike and North Lake Company and its rival the Wisconsin Lakes Ice and Cartage Company over the rights to harvest ice resulted in pitched battles between workers and the deployment of a steamship icebreaker to smash competing supplies.

=== Transportation ===
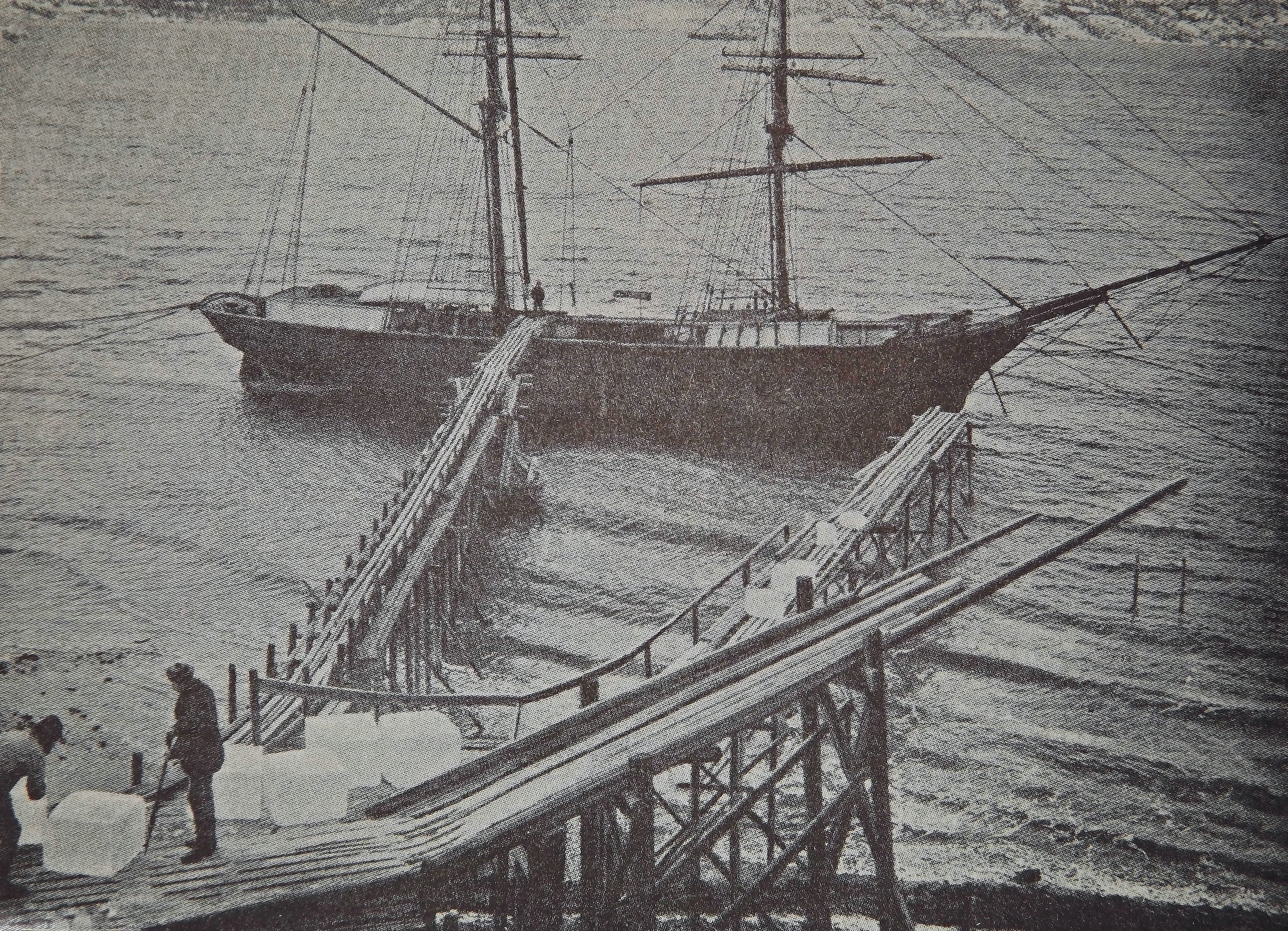
Schooner being loaded with ice in Norway using ramps, late 19th century

Natural ice typically had to be moved several times between being harvested and used by the end customer. A wide range of methods were used, including wagons, railroads, ships and barges. Ships were particularly important to the ice trade, particularly in the early phase of the trade, when the focus of the trade was on international exports from the U.S. and railroad networks across the country were non-existent.

Typically, ice traders hired vessels to ship ice as freight, although Frederic Tudor initially purchased his own vessel and the Tudor Company later bought three fast cargo ships of its own in 1877. (Note: These three ships were the Ice King, the Iceberg and the Iceland.) Ice was first transported in ships at the end of the 18th century, when it was occasionally used as ballast. Shipping ice as ballast, however, required it to be cleanly cut in order to avoid it shifting around as it melted, which was not easily done until Wyeth's invention of the ice-cutter in 1825. The uniform blocks that Wyeth's process produced also made it possible to pack more ice into the limited space of a ship's hold, and significantly reduced the losses from melting. The ice was typically packed up tightly with sawdust, and the hold was then closed to prevent warmer air entering; other forms of protective dunnage used to protect ice included hay and pine tree cuttings. This requirement for large quantities of sawdust coincided with the growth in the New England lumber industry in the 1830s; sawdust had no other use at the time, and was in fact considered something of a problem, so its use in the ice trade proved very useful to the local timber industry.

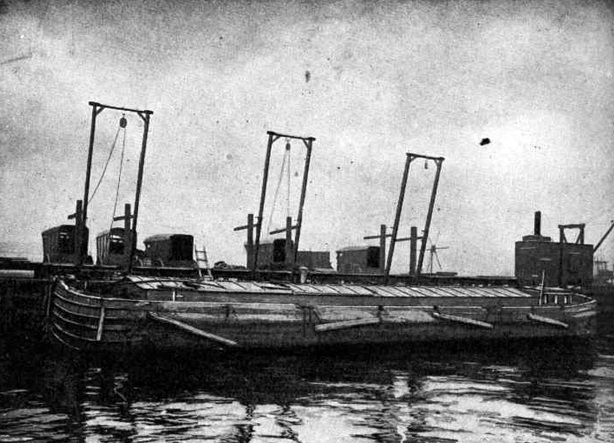
An ice barge in New York City, early 20th century

Ships carrying ice needed to be particularly strong, and there was a premium placed on recruiting good crews, able to move the cargo quickly to its location before it melted. By the end of the 19th century, the preferred choice was a wooden-hulled vessel, to avoid rust corrosion from the melting ice, while windmill pumps were installed to remove the excess water from the hull using bilge pumps. Ice cargoes tended to cause damage to ships in the longer term, as the constant melting of the ice and the resulting water and steam encouraged dry rot. Shipment sizes varied; depending on the ports and route. The typical late 19th-century U.S. vessel was a schooner, carrying around 600 tons (500,000 kg) of ice; a large shipment from Norway to England might include up to 900 tons (800,000 kg).

It was important to keep track of the amount of ice being loaded onto a ship for both commercial and safety reasons, so ice blocks were each weighed before they went onto a ship, and a total tally of the weight of the ice was recorded. Initially a crude method of loading involving ice tongs and a whip was used to lower the separated blocks of ice into the hold, but an improved method was developed by the 1870s involving a levered platform, superseded by a counterweighted platform device by 1890. Ships were loaded quickly to prevent the ice from melting and, in U.S. ports, an average cargo could be loaded in just two days. Freight charges were paid on the intake, or departure, weight of the cargo, and conditions were laid down on the handling of the ice along the route.

Barges were also used to transport ice, particularly along the Hudson River, doubling on occasion as storage units as well. These barges could carry between 400 and 800 tons (400,000 to 800,000 kg) of ice and, like ice-carrying ships, windmills were typically installed to power the barge's bilge pumps. Barges were believed to help preserve ice from melting, as the ice was stored beneath the deck and insulated by the river. Charlie Morse introduced larger, seagoing ice barges in the 1890s in order to supply New York; these were pulled by schooners and could each carry up to 3,000 tons (three million kg) of ice.

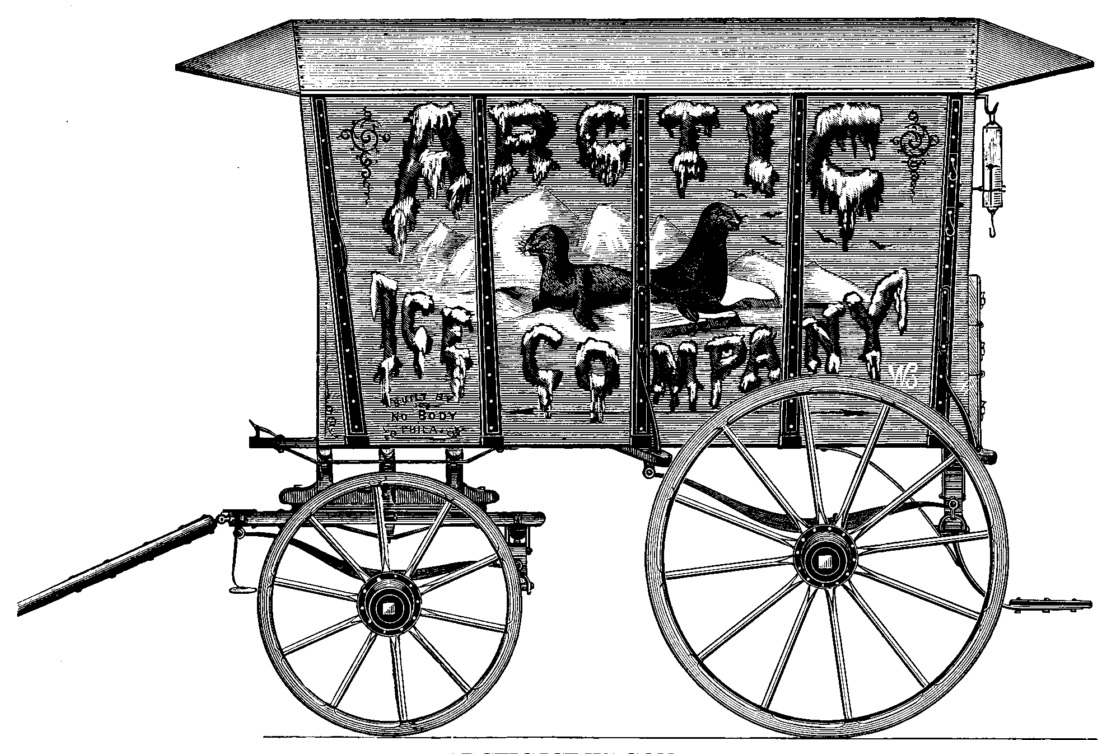
An 1884 "Arctic" ice wagon, designed for the delivery of ice to commercial and domestic customers

For much of the 19th century, it was particularly cheap to transport ice from New England and other key ice-producing centres, helping to grow the industry. The region's role as a gateway for trade with the interior of the U.S. meant that trading ships brought more cargoes to the ports than there were cargoes to take back; unless they could find a return cargo, ships would need to carry rocks as ballast instead. Ice was the only profitable alternative to rocks and, as a result, the ice trade from New England could negotiate lower shipping rates than would have been possible from other international locations. Later in the century, the ice trade between Maine and New York took advantage of Maine's emerging requirements for Philadelphia's coal: the ice ships delivering ice from Maine would bring back the fuel, leading to the trade being termed the "ice and coaling" business.

Ice was also transported by railroad from 1841 onwards, the first use of the technique being on the track laid down between Fresh Pond and Charleston by the Charlestown Branch Railroad Company. A special railroad car was built to insulate the ice and equipment designed to allow the cars to be loaded. In 1842 a new railroad to Fitchburg was used to access the ice at Walden Pond. Ice was not a popular cargo with railway employees, however, as it had to be moved promptly to avoid melting and was generally awkward to transport. By the 1880s ice was being shipped by rail across the North American continent.

The final part of the supply chain for domestic and smaller commercial customers involved the delivery of ice, typically using an ice wagon. In the U.S., ice was cut into 25-, 50- and 100-pound blocks (11, 23 and 45 kg) then distributed by horse-drawn ice wagons. An iceman, driving the cart, would then deliver the ice to the household, using ice tongs to hold the cubes. Deliveries could occur either daily or twice daily. By the 1870s, various specialist distributors existed in the major cities, with local fuel dealers or other businesses selling and delivering ice in the smaller communities. In Britain, ice was rarely sold to domestic customers via specialist dealers during the 19th century, instead usually being sold through fishmongers, butchers and chemists, who kept ice on their premises for their own commercial use.

=== Storage ===
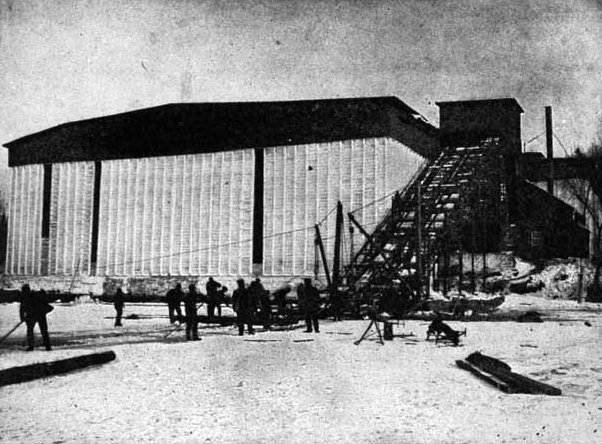
A large, commercial U.S. ice house, early 20th century

Ice had to be stored at multiple points between harvesting and its final use by a customer. One method for doing this was the construction of ice houses to hold the product, typically either shortly after the ice was first harvested or at regional depots after it had been shipped out. Early ice houses were relatively small, but later storage facilities were the size of large warehouses and contained much larger quantities of ice.

The understanding of thermodynamics was limited at the start of the 19th century, when it was believed that the key to the successful storage to ice was the construction of underground ice houses, where it was believed, incorrectly, that it would always be cool enough to store ice successfully. European ice houses were based on this theory, and used underground chambers, often built at considerable expense, to store the winter harvest. Some farmers in Virginia, however, had developed much cheaper icehouses, elevated off the ground, built from wood and insulated with hay. In addition to the temperature that ice was held at, there was also a need to efficiently drain off the melted water, as this water would further melt the remaining ice much faster than warm air would do.

Tudor investigated various ice houses in 1805 and came to conclude they could be constructed above ground as well. His early ice houses in Cuba had inner and outer timber walls, insulated with peat and sawdust, with some form of a ventilation system, and these formed the basic design for ice houses during the rest of the century. By 1819, however, Tudor was also building ice houses from brick, able to hold more than 200 tons (200,000 kg) of ice, using charcoal within the walls for insulation. By the 1840s, warehouses by the Pond were up to 36,000 square feet (3,300 square metres) in size, being built of brick to avoid the risk of fire from the new railroad line. The ice houses remained extremely flammable, however, and many caught fire, including Sydney's first ice house which was completely destroyed in 1862.

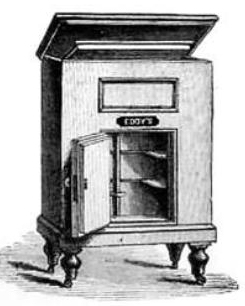
An Eddy Darrius refrigerator with compartments to hold natural ice, 1881

The size of the ice houses made it difficult to load ice into them; in 1827 Wyeth invented a lever and horse-drawn pulley system to raise blocks of ice through the roofs of the warehouses. Later improvements to loading included the use of lift systems to raise the blocks of ice to the top of the building, first using horse power, then steam power; the largest warehouses later introduced conveyor belt systems to bring the ice into storage. Power houses containing the equipment to support these were built alongside the ice houses, and care was taken to avoid the risk of fire from this machinery. Warehouses were typically painted either white or yellow in order to reflect the sun during the summer. A typical Hudson River warehouse might be 400 feet (120 m) long, 100 feet (30 m) deep and three stories high, able to hold 50,000 tons (four million kg) of ice. The later railroad ice houses could hold up to 250,000 tons (220 million kg) apiece.

In contrast, initially the ice trade in Norway made do without ice houses, taking the ice directly from the lakes to the ships for transport during the winter and spring; between the 1850s and 1870s, however, numerous ice houses were constructed, allowing exports to take place year-round.

Ice houses were also built in the major ice-consuming cities to hold the imported ice before final sale and consumption, where they were often termed depots. In London, the early ice depots were often circular and called wells or shades; the New Cattle Market depot built in 1871 was 42 feet (13 m) wide and 72 feet (22 m) deep, able to hold 3,000 short tons (three million kg) of ice. Later ice depots at Shadwell and Kings Cross in London were larger still, and, along with incoming barges, were used for storing Norwegian ice. The city of New York was unusual in not building ice depots near the ports, instead using incoming barges and, on occasion, ships that were delivering the ice as floating warehouses.

For a domestic or commercial customer to use ice, however, it was typically necessary to be able to store it for a period away from an ice house. As a result, iceboxes and domestic refrigerators were a critical final stage in the storage process: without them, most households could not use and consume ice. By 1816, Tudor was selling Boston refrigerators called "Little Ice Houses" to households in Charleston; these were made of wood, lined with iron and designed to hold three pounds (1.4 kg) of ice. Household refrigerators were manufactured in the 1840s on the east coast, most notably by Darius Eddy of Massachusetts and Winship of Boston; many of these were shipped west. The degree to which natural ice was adopted by local communities in the 19th century heavily depended on the availability and uptake of iceboxes.

== Applications ==
=== Consumption ===
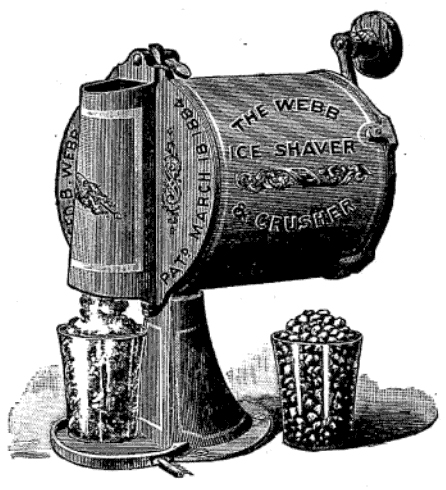
An ice crusher, designed to support specialised 19th century drinks

The ice trade enabled the consumption of a wide range of new products. One simple use for natural ice was to chill drinks, either being directly added to the glass or barrel, or indirectly chilling it in a wine cooler or similar container. Iced drinks were a novelty and were initially viewed with concern by customers, worried about the health risks, although this rapidly vanished in the U.S. By the mid-19th century, water was always chilled in America if possible. Iced milk was also popular, and German lager, traditionally drunk chilled, also used ice. Drinks such as sherry-cobblers and mint juleps were created that could only be made using crushed ice.

There were distinct differences in 19th-century American and European attitudes to adding ice directly to drinks, with the Europeans regarding this as an unpleasant habit; British visitors to India were surprised to see the Anglo-Indian elite prepared to drink iced water. Some Hindus in India regarded ice as unclean for religious reasons, and thus an inappropriate food.

The large-scale production of ice cream also resulted from the ice trade. Ice cream had been produced in small quantities since at least the 17th century, but this depended both on having large quantities of ice available, and substantial amounts of labor to manufacture it by constantly agitating the mixture to produce the light texture associated with ice cream. By the 1820s and 1830s, the availability of ice in the cities of the U.S. east coast meant that ice cream was becoming increasingly popular, but still an essentially luxury product. In 1843, however, a new ice cream maker was patented by Nancy Johnson which required far less physical effort and time; similar designs were also produced in England and France. Combined with the growing ice trade, ice cream became much more widely available and consumed in greater quantities. In Britain, Norwegian ice was used by the growing Italian community in London from the 1850s onwards to popularise ice cream with the general public.

=== Commercial applications ===
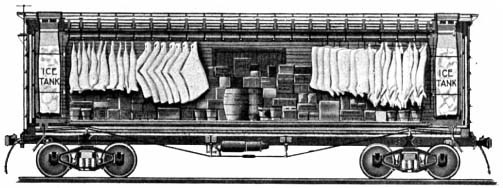
An 1870 refrigerator car, showing the ice stored at both ends

The ice trade revolutionized the way that food was preserved and transported. Before the 19th century, preservation had depended upon techniques such as curing or smoking, but large supplies of natural ice allowed foods to be refrigerated or frozen instead. Although using ice to chill foods was relatively simple, it required considerable experimentation to produce efficient and reliable methods for controlling the flow of warm and cold air in different containers and transport systems. In the early stages of the ice trade there was also a tension between preserving the limited supply of ice, by limiting the flow of air over it, and preserving the food, which depended on circulating more air over the ice to create colder temperatures.

Early approaches to preserving food used variants of traditional cold boxes to solve the problem of how to take small quantities of products short distances to market. Thomas Moore, an engineer from Maryland, invented an early refrigerator which he patented in 1803; this involved a large, insulated wooden box, with a tin container of ice embedded in the top. This refrigerator primarily relied upon simple insulation, rather than ventilation, but the design was widely adopted by farmers and small traders, and illegal copies abounded. By the 1830s portable refrigerator chests became used in the meat trade, taking advantage of the growing supplies of ice to use ventilation to better preserve the food. By the 1840s, improved supplies and an understanding of the importance of circulating air was making a significant improvement to refrigeration in the U.S.

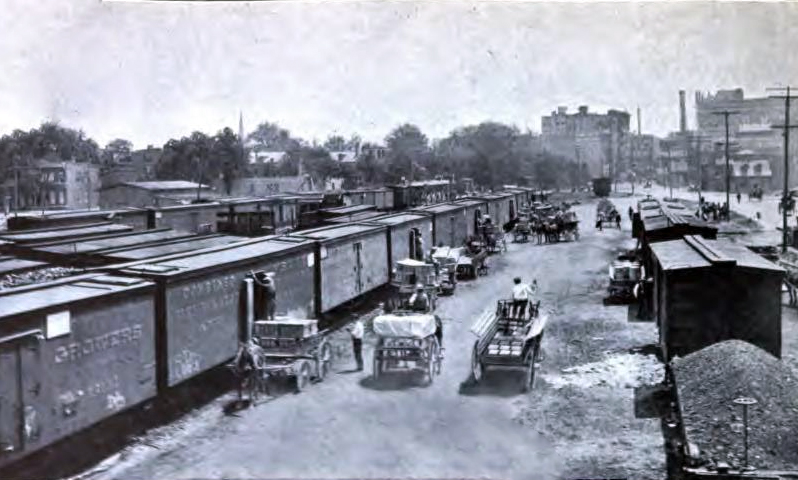
An icing and loading railroad platform, Norfolk, Virginia, c. 1900

With the development of the U.S. railroad system, natural ice became used to transport larger quantities of goods much longer distances through the invention of the refrigerator car. The first refrigerator cars emerged in the late 1850s and early 1860s, and were crude constructions holding up to 3,000 lbs (1,360 kg) of ice, on top of which the food was placed. It was quickly found that placing meat directly on top of the ice caused it to perish; subsequent designs hung the meat from hooks, allowing the meat to breathe, while the swinging carcasses improved the circulation in the car. After the Civil War, J. B Sutherland, John Bate and William Davis all patented improved refrigerator cars, which used stacks of ice placed at either end and improved air circulation to keep their contents cool. This improved ventilation was essential to avoid warm air building up in the car and causing damage to the goods. Salt could be added to the ice to increase the cooling effect to produce an iced refrigerator car, which preserved foods even better. For much of the 19th century, the different gauges of train lines made it difficult and time-consuming to move chilled cargoes between lines, which was a problem when the ice was continually melting; by the 1860s, refrigerator cars with adjustable axles were being created to speed up this process.

Natural ice became essential to the transportation of perishable foods over the railroads; slaughtering and dressing meat, then transporting it, was much more efficient in terms of freight costs and opened up the industries of the Mid-West, while, as the industrialist Jonathan Armour argued, ice and refrigerator cars "changed the growing of fruits and berries from a gamble...to a national industry".

Refrigerated ships were also made possible, allowing perishable goods to be exported internationally, first from the U.S. and then from countries such as Argentina and Australia. Early ships had stored their chilled goods along with the main cargo of ice; the first ships to transport chilled meat to Britain, designed by Bate, adapted the railroad refrigerator cars, using ice at either end of the hold and a ventilation fan to keep the meat cool. An improved version, invented by James Craven, piped a brine solution through the ice and then the hold. This created a drier atmosphere in the hold, preserving the meat better. Natural ice was also used in fishing industries to preserve catches, initially in the eastern American fisheries. In 1858 the Grimsby fishing fleet began to take ice out to sea with them to preserve their catches; this allowed longer journeys and bigger catches, and the fishing industry became the biggest single user of ice in Britain.

The ice trade enabled its widespread use in medicine in attempts to treat diseases and to alleviate their symptoms, as well as making tropical hospitals more bearable. In Calcutta, for example, part of each ice shipment was specially reserved in the city's ice house for the use of the local doctors. By the middle of the 19th century, the British Royal Navy was using imported ice to cool the interiors of its ships' gun turrets. In 1864, after several attempts, salmon eggs were finally shipped successfully from Britain to Australia, using natural ice to keep them chilled en route, enabling the creation of the Tasmanian salmon fishery industry.

== See also ==
- List of ice companies

== General and cited references ==
- Armour, Jonathan Ogden (1906). The Packers, the Private Car Lines, and the People. Philadelphia: H. Altemus. OCLC 566166885.
- Blain, Bodil Bjerkvik (February 2006). "Melting Markets: The Rise and Decline of the Anglo-Norwegian Ice Trade, 1850–1920". Working Papers of the Global Economic History Network. 20/06. London: London School of Economics.
- Bunting, W. W. (1982). "The East India Ice Trade". In Proctor, D. V. (ed.). Ice Carrying Trade at Sea. London: National Maritime Museum. ISBN 978-0-905555-48-5.
- Calandro, Daniel (September 2005). "Hudson River Valley Icehouses and Ice Industry" (PDF). New York, U.S.: Hudson River Valley Institute, Marist College. Archived from the original (PDF) on 2016-07-02.
- Cummings, Richard O. (1949). The American Ice Harvests: A Historical Study in Technology, 1800–1918. Berkeley and Los Angeles: California University Press. OCLC 574420883.
- Dickason, David G. (1991). "The Nineteenth-Century Indo-American Ice Trade: An Hyperborean Epic". Modern Asian Studies. 25 (1): 55–89. doi:10.1017/s0026749x00015845. JSTOR 312669. S2CID 144932927.
- Herold, Marc W. (2011). "Ice in the Tropics: The Export of 'Crystal Blocks of Yankee Coldness' to India and Brazil". Revista Espaço Acadêmico (126): 162–177. Archived from the original on 2016-09-14.
- Hiles, Theron (1893). The Ice Crop: How to Harvest, Store, Ship and Use Ice. New York: Orange Judd Company. ISBN 978-1-4290-1045-0. OCLC 1828565.
- Keithahn, E. L. (1945). "Alaska Ice, Inc". The Pacific Northwest Quarterly. 36 (2): 121–131. JSTOR 40486705.
- Isaacs, Nigel (2011). "Sydney's First Ice". Sydney Journal. 3 (2): 26–35. doi:10.5130/sj.v3i2.2368.
- Maw, W. H.; Dredge, J. (August 4, 1871). "Ice". Engineering: An Illustrated Weekly Journal. 12. London: 76–77.
- McWilliams, Mark (2012). The Story Behind the Dish: Classic American Foods. Santa Barbara, U.S.: ABC-CLIO. ISBN 978-0-313-38510-0.
- Ouren, Tore (1982). "The Norwegian Ice Trade". In Proctor, D. V. (ed.). Ice Carrying Trade at Sea. London: National Maritime Museum. ISBN 978-0-905555-48-5.
- Parker, W. J. Lewis (1982). "The East Coast Ice Trade of the United States". In Proctor, D. V. (ed.). Ice Carrying Trade at Sea. London: National Maritime Museum. ISBN 978-0-905555-48-5.
- Rodengen, Jeffrey L. (1997). The Legend of York International. Fort Lauderdale: Write Stuff Syndicate Inc. ISBN 978-0-945903-17-8.
- Shachtman, Tom (2000). Absolute Zero and the Conquest of Cold. Boston: Mariner. ISBN 978-0-618-08239-1.
- Smith, Philip Chadwick Foster (1982). "Concentrated Wenham: New England Ice in Albion". In Proctor, D. V. (ed.). Ice Carrying Trade at Sea. London: National Maritime Museum. ISBN 978-0-905555-48-5.
- Stevens, Robert White (1871). On the Stowage of Ships and Their Cargoes (5th ed.). London: Longmans, Green, Reader, & Dyer. OCLC 25773877.
- Weightman, Gavin (2003). The Frozen Water Trade: How Ice From New England Lakes Kept the World Cool. London: Harper Collins. ISBN 978-0-00-710286-0.
- Weld, L. D. H. (1908). Private Freight Cars and American Railways. New York: Columbia University. OCLC 1981145.
- Woods, Philip H (2011). Bath, Maine's Charlie Morse: Ice King and Wall Street Scoundrel. Charleston, U.S.: The History Press. ISBN 978-1-60949-274-8.
