= Ice famine =

Historical scarcity of commercial ice

An ice famine was a scarcity of commercial ice, usually during the hot summer months, common before the widespread use of the refrigerator. It often resulted in the widespread spoilage of food and medicines, and in some instances in death from heat stroke.

== Instances ==
- In 1918 ammonia was diverted to manufacturing munitions which led to a shortage of commercial ice. Harvesting of natural ice and storage for summer was increased.
- 1911 Eastern North America heat wave.

== History ==
In the 19th and early 20th centuries, ice was at a very high demand in America. A man named Frederic Tudor, dubbed the Ice King, brought forth a whole industry for ice. Ice was a necessity for many businesses who sold food and homes who hoped to preserve their food because the refrigerator and freezer were not yet invented. The people’s only choices were commercial and residential ice boxes that needed to be replenished every time there was a rise in temperature. Tudor saw the importance and the possibly high demand for ice which he immediately capitalized on. He started his work in Massachusetts and expanded his market over time. Once his ice had chilled the drinks and preserved the food of many Americans, it quickly became a highly desired commodity, and this commodity was supplied by ice harvesting which was done on frozen over fields and bodies of water as well as ice factories. The former provided most of the ice for the industry while the latter produced a significantly lesser amount.

The ice market boomed and ice was being transported from anywhere possible to many cities in the United States. New York City and Chicago were major consumers of American ice because there were higher densities of people and businesses that heavily relied on ice. But many problems arose from the relatively new industry that did not have the best technology to ensure a sufficient supply and that wasted much of the ice during the transportation process. Since the demand for ice was so high in nearly all of the United States, any delay or shortage in supply threatened the people with an ice famine. Some of the main causes of ice famines were unreliable trains as modes of transport, ever increasing prices, and unfavorable weather conditions. Unfortunately, the people who controlled the ice supply in America could not control every variable that helped produce large quantities of ice, so it was never guaranteed that the American demand would be met.

One of the biggest issues in meeting the demand of ice was the lack of transportation. At this time in America, there was no such thing as refrigerated trucks that could make deliveries via highways. Instead, there was a rail system that ran ice from the mountains to different cities and towns that did not have ice factories, or had ones that could only meet some of the demand. However, these rail systems were also the means of transportation for fruits and vegetables that were not local to a given area. These three goods were all in high demand but train cars could not always be allocated in order to satisfy the demand of all three necessities. When fruits and vegetables were priorities, ice companies would have complications getting an ample amount of ice out for shipment. The inadequate number of train cars to meet demand was not the only issue with the rail system. The trains were just unreliable as a whole. On July 4, 1894, Ann Arbor Argus reported that Chicago had no more than a day’s worth of ice for the whole city. This normally would not be a problem with a shipment of ice on its way but the train carrying the ice was stuck outside of the city. This posed a problem for everyone in the city because they would not have any immediate means to keep their food or meat in Chicago’s meat packing district cold.

Another cause, or at least threat, of ice famine was World War I. During the war, the American government needed most of the country’s supply of ammonia. Ammonia was a chemical used in ice factories that helped make the ice and also refrigerated the ice until it was ready for consumption, but Americans' need for ice was considered insignificant when the American Government wanted to go to war. The government ultimately needed the ammonia to provide soldiers with sufficient ammunition to fight the war. Since a majority of the ammonia supply was fueling war efforts, ice factories could not generate nearly enough ice to meet demand. This caused the countryside and cities, especially New York City, to have small quantities of ice and no ice at all in some areas. In order to help the American people out of the ice famine, The Department of Agriculture released plans to the public that described how to make, and effectively use, a homemade refrigeration unit.

Ice was not only a vital and competitive industry in the 19th and 20th centuries but it was also a controversial one in New York City. Towards the end of the 19th century, New Yorkers were unhappy with the way that the ice industry was being run. According to Historian Edward T. O’Donnell, skeptical customers accused ice companies of “price gouging and monopolistic practices”. The customers seemed to believe that the companies were purposely creating ice famines so that they could hike the prices. Higher prices left a lot of people without ice which made summer months very tough. The controversy over unethical practices in the ice industry turned out to be true when New York ice companies formed into what was called the Consolidated Ice Company. The Consolidated Ice Company was, by definition, a monopoly that controlled everything about the ice industry in the city that consumed the most ice. They could create an ice famine in whole communities by controlling supply and prices while against few, if any, competitors. Shortly after Consolidated Ice Company became as powerful as it was, information surfaced about a corrupt politician helping the monopoly come to fruition.

The worries of ice famines ended in the early 1900s. At this point in time, refrigerators and air conditioners were being introduced to the market. It did not take long for people to move away from ice-reliant storage of all kinds. In 1927, General Electric became the first company to mass-produce refrigerator units that did not need ice. This ultimately ended the ice famines and the lucrativeness of ice.
