= Vivekanandar Illam =

Museum in South India

Coordinates: 13°02′57″N 80°16′49″E

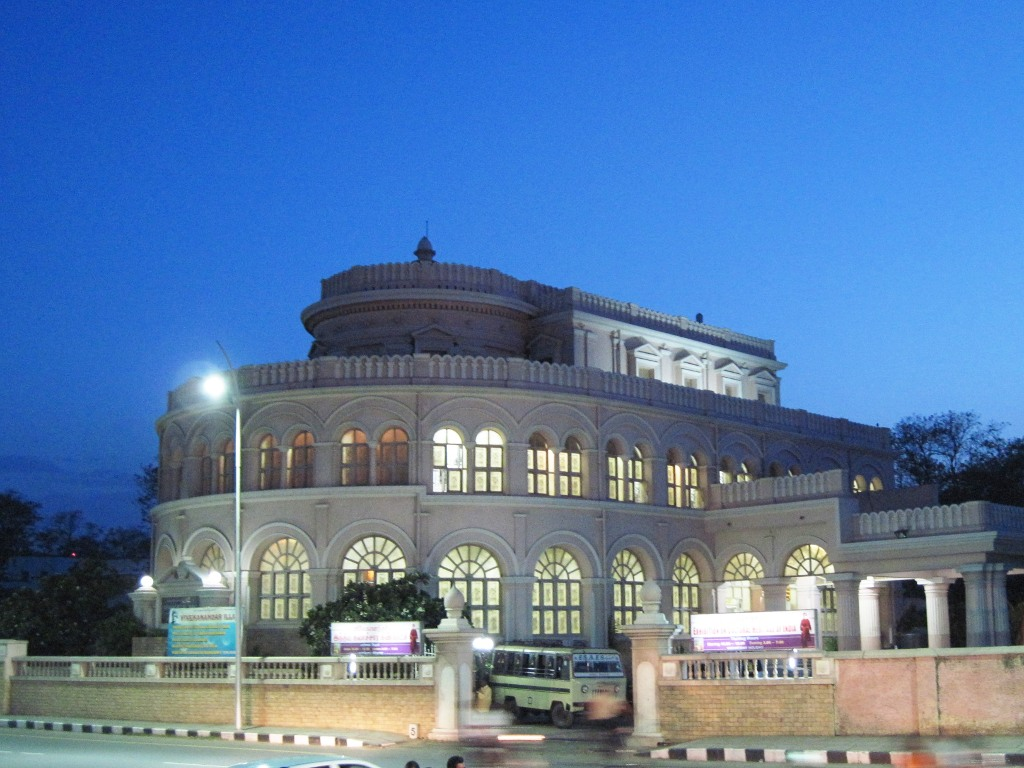
- Vivekanandar Illam

- Location within Tamil Nadu
- Former names: Ice House

General information
- Status: In use
- Type: Museum
- Location: Triplicane, Chennai, Chennai, India
- Current tenants: Ramakrishna Mission
- Topped-out: 1842
- Owner: Government of Tamil Nadu

Technical details
- Floor count: 2

Vivekanandar Illam, earlier known as Ice House or Castle Kernan, is a historical building in Chennai, India. It was constructed in 1842 by Frederic Tudor. Indian Saint Swami Vivekananda stayed in the building when he visited Chennai in 1897, and it was later renamed in his honor. It is currently maintained by Ramakrishna Math and houses an exhibition on the life of Vivekananda.

== History ==
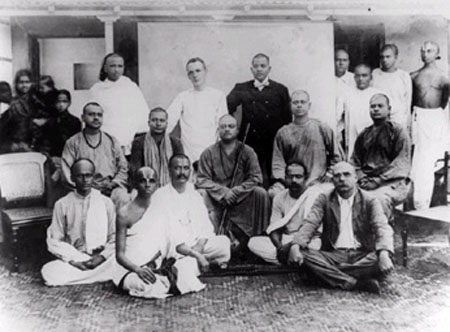
Swami Vivekananda (on the chair, third from left) and Biligiri Iyengar (on the floor, second from left) at the Ice House in 1897

In 1842, Frederic Tudor constructed the building facing the Bay of Bengal as a facility to store ice. In 1880, the business collapsed and the building was sold to Biligiri Iyengar, an advocate in the Madras High Court. Iyengar re-modeled the house and named it Castle Kernan after his friend and judge in Madras High Court. When Swami Vivekananda visited Madras in 1897, he stayed in the building between 6 and 14 February 1897. Later, Ramakrishna Math functioned from the building from 1897 to 1906.

In 1914, the building was acquired by the Government of Madras and functioned as a hostel and training school for children run by R. S. Subbalakshmi. In 1963, on the birth Centenary of Swami Vivekananda, the Government of Tamil Nadu renamed the building as 'Vivekanandar Illam' meaning 'Vivekananda House' in Tamil. In 1997, Government of Tamil Nadu leased the building to Ramakrishna Math, and it currently houses an exhibition on the life of Swami Vivekananda.

== See also ==
- Heritage structures in Chennai
