= Iceboro, Maine =

- Village
- Interactive map of Iceboro, Maine
- Coordinates: 44°06′44″N 69°46′43″W
- Country: United States
- State: Maine
- County: Sagadaho
- Town: Richmond
- Elevation: 138 ft (42 m)
- Time zone: UTC-5 (Eastern (EST))
  - Summer (DST): UTC-4 (EDT)
- GNIS feature ID: 579428

Iceboro is a village in the town of Richmond in Sagadahoc County, Maine, United States. The village is located at an altitude of 138 feet. The community had a post office from 1882 to 1905.
