= Frederic Tudor =

19th-century American businessman

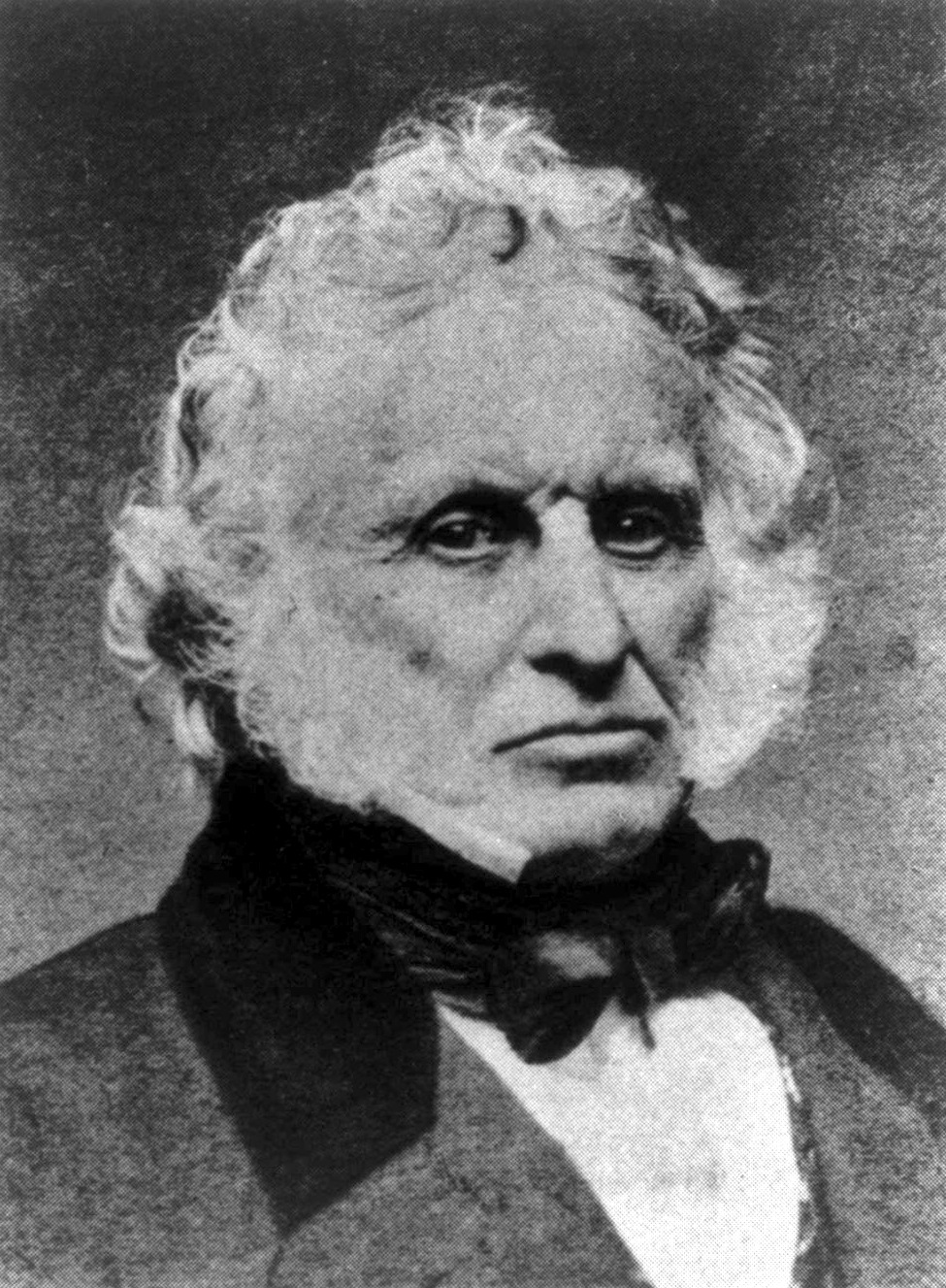
- Born: September 4, 1783; Boston, Massachusetts, U.S.
- Died: February 6, 1864 (aged 80); Boston, Massachusetts, U.S.
- Resting place: King's Chapel Burying Ground, Boston (originally)
- Other name: "Ice King"
- Known for: Establishing the ice trade
- Spouse: Euphemia Fenno (m. 1834)
- Father: William Tudor
- Relatives: William II (brother)

Frederic Tudor (September 4, 1783 – February 6, 1864) was an American businessman and merchant. Known as Boston's "Ice King", he was the founder of the Tudor Ice Company, one of the first American multi-national businesses, and a pioneer of the international ice trade in the early 19th century. He made a fortune shipping ice cut from New England ponds to ports in the Caribbean, Europe, and as far away as India and Hong Kong.

== Early life and education ==
Tudor was the third son of William Tudor, a wealthy Boston lawyer, and Delia Jarvis Tudor. They had six children: William Tudor, John Henry, Frederic, Emma, James, and Henry. In 1795, Frederic's grandfather passed, leaving most of his assets to Frederic's father, including "Rockwood", a farm in Saugus, Massachusetts that the family eventually moved to.

In November 1796, Frederic, then 13 years of age, wrote from Boston to his father, who was abroad at the time, that "Mr Ducator & Marshall have opened a Store in state Street ... I am with them & at present the youngest Apprentice..." He had moved away from Rockwood and given up school for the position, but reassured his father that he was attending an evening school and was treated with "great kindness". He hoped that his father "... will not be displeased with my going so young". However, Frederic did not continue the apprenticeship for the standard three to five year period. The reason was unclear and he returned to Rockwood.

=== John Henry's Trip ===
John Henry, Frederic's brother, struggled to find work after studying at Harvard University for four years. He wrote a letter to a friend in 1801, that he was "looking out every day for a store, and will enter any one where [he] can have plenty of work and be treated like a gentleman", but found he was expected to clean the shop and work under "uneducated men". John Henry wrote that merchants "...are a contemptible set of beings. They are afraid to receive a young man from College, lest they should expose their meanness and ignorance." Regardless, both he and Frederic eventually became merchants themselves; they bought a lot of mahogany furniture which they sold to dealers in Havana, Cuba. A few months later, John Henry injured his knee. In February 1801, their father noted that John Henry had not recovered. He hoped a trip might assist John Henry's health, and since John Henry's had connections in Cuba from business dealings, he decided to send him there. He gave John Henry a thousand dollars, and appointed Frederic to be a companion and assistant.

The trip from Boston took a month, and the brothers on arrival were surprised by the climate and environment. John Henry however, stayed mostly house-bound, learning Spanish, and by May his knee was worse. A doctor recommended he stay for the whole summer for health, but John Henry insisted on returning home. The brothers took a ship in June to Charleston, South Carolina, and continued on to Virginia after receiving further money from their father. They eventually travelled to Bath, Pennsylvania as John Henry wanted to try the mineral waters for his knee. During the trip, John Henry wrote in remark to Frederic's perceived laziness, "It is the greatest difficulty I can get him to do anything. I hope there will be a time when I shall be able to rouse him." When they reached Bath, John Henry's knee started to exhibit bumps, and he and Frederic travelled to Philadelphia, where their mother and brother William joined them. In September, Frederic left for Boston, and four months later, John Henry passed away.

It has been theorized that the extreme heat that John Henry and Frederic experienced on the trip, and John's eventual death, led Frederic to believe that ice would have helped his brother recover. However, Frederic's sister Emma wrote in an 1839 letter to a friend that the idea of selling ice to the Caribbean came from her brother William. Emma's husband, Robert Hallowell Gardiner, similarly wrote in his private autobiography that he had heard William joke at a gathering that they should sell ice to the West Indies, but Frederic aggressively disagreed.

== Career ==
In 1806 (aged 23), Tudor bought his first brig, Favorite, to carry ice cut from his father's farm Rockwood in Saugus 1,500 miles (2,400 km) from Charlestown to Martinique. It left dock on February 10, 1806, to the following report in the Boston Gazette: "No joke. A vessel has cleared at the Custom House for Martinique with a cargo of ice. We hope this will not prove a slippery speculation." While he secured a cargo of ice, a vessel in which to ship it, and formulated his plan of operation, he sent his brother William and his cousin, James Savage, ahead to obtain a monopoly from the various governments of the islands: "We wish you to procure from the gov' of Cuba a grant exclusive in which we offer you either to take a conces' of half or procure the privilege for us & we engage to pay you one thousand dollars with reasonable charges, in obtaining it you, however, to determine which you will do & write to that effect as early as possible." Although much of the ice melted during the three-week journey south, he did manage to sell much of what remained on board for a loss of $4,500 overall (equivalent to $90,000 in 2025). However, in the subsequent year, Tudor realized severe financial losses on three shipments to Havana in the brig Trident.

A few factors were in Tudor's favor. Hiring ships was cheap because many left Boston empty to collect cargo later in the West Indies. Ice was free, save for the labor of cutting it. Sawdust was also free as a waste product of the lumber industry and insulated ice effectively. Tudor had his first profits in 1810 when his gross sales amounted to about $7,400, then increasing to just short of $9,000 (equivalent to $150,000 and $190,000 in 2025); but of that, he received only $1,000 (equivalent to $21,000 in 2025) owing to the "villainous conduct" of his agent. At this point, his personal debts far outweighed his income, and he spent parts of 1812 and 1813 in debtor's prison. By 1815, however, he had managed to borrow $2,100 (equivalent to $37,000 in 2025), both to buy ice and to pay for a new ice house in Havana. It was a double-shelled structure, twenty-five feet square on its outside dimension, nineteen feet square on the interior, and sixteen feet high, holding some 150 tons of ice. "Pursued by sheriffs to the very wharf" in Boston, Tudor set sail for Havana on November 1, 1815.

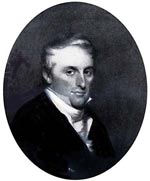
Frederic Tudor at a young age

By 1816, Tudor was shipping ice from Massachusetts to Cuba with ever-increasing efficiency and decided to try his hand at importing Cuban fruit to New York. In August of that year, he borrowed $3,000 (at 40% interest, equivalent to $57,000 in 2025) for a shipload of limes, oranges, bananas, and pears, preserving it with 15 tons of ice and 3 tons of hay. The experiment ended in disaster as virtually all the fruit rotted during the month-long voyage, leaving Tudor with several thousand dollars' worth of new debt. Still, he pressed on, opening up new markets in three southern U.S. cities (Charleston, South Carolina; Savannah, Georgia; and New Orleans, Louisiana).

Tudor spent the next few years experimenting with various kinds of insulation. Ice was packed aboard ship with wood shavings, sawdust, or rice chaff on its outside surfaces to insulate it against heat. The blocks were also stacked together like well-fitted masonry. He constructed ice houses throughout the tropics and created a demand there for cold refreshments.

By 1825, Tudor was doing well with ice sales, but the difficulty of hand-cutting large blocks limited his company's growth. However, one supplier, Nathaniel Jarvis Wyeth, harnessed horses to a metal blade to cut ice. Wyeth's ice plow made mass production a reality and allowed Tudor to more than triple his production.

In 1833, fellow Boston-based merchant Samuel Austin proposed a partnership for selling ice to India, then some 16,000 miles (26,000 km) and four months away from Massachusetts. On May 12, 1833, the brig Tuscany sailed from Boston for Calcutta, its hold filled with 180 tons of ice cut during the winter. When it approached the Ganges in September 1833, many believed the delivery was an elaborate joke, but the ship still had 100 tons of ice upon arrival. Over the next 20 years, Calcutta would become Tudor's most lucrative destination, yielding an estimated $220,000 in profits (equivalent to $8.5 million in 2025). Tudor had three ice houses built in India for storage, in Calcutta, Bombay, and Madras. When Tudor's India business eventually collapsed in the 1880's as a result of commercial refrigeration, the ice house in Madras was sold and remodeled to become the Vivekanandar Illam.

In the early 1830s, Tudor had also begun to speculate in coffee futures with his ice business as collateral. Initially, coffee prices did rise, and Tudor made millions of dollars, but in 1834, Tudor fell more than a quarter-million dollars in debt (equivalent to $8.1 million in 2025), forcing him to refocus on the ice trade. By the end of the year, Tudor wrote that 1834 had been unsatisfactory in all but one aspect – that of his marriage to a girl 30 years his junior.

In the summer of 1833, at the age of 50, Frederic had turned his attentions to 19-year-old Euphemia Fenno, who met him while she was visiting Boston from Mount Upton, New York. He began writing to her regularly, with the result that Frederic and Euphemia were married on January 2, 1834. The couple went on to have six children. By then the ice business had expanded from New York up through Maine.

The horse-drawn Charlestown Branch Railroad expanded to connect the Fresh Pond ice houses of Tudor, Addison Gage, and Nathaniel J. Wyeth with several wharves in Charlestown. Tudor Wharf is so named because it is where his ships departed. With the first ice shipment in December 1841, it made the process of transporting ice to ships considerably more efficient. By the 1840s, ice was being shipped all over the world; in 1845, an ice house was opened in Hong Kong, although it only remained open until 1850. Although Tudor was now just a small part of the trade, his profits allowed him to pay off his debts and resume living a comfortable existence.

== Tudor family and Nahant ==
The Tudors belonged to a prominent Boston Brahmin family, and Frederic inherited his family's grounds in Nahant, Massachusetts. In 1825, after constructing his summer cottage in the center of town, he began a lifelong campaign to plant trees on treeless Nahant. By 1832 he had 3,358 trees growing in his nursery, and within two years he had some 4,000 trees in cultivation, offering them to summer residents for free if they would plant them on their properties. The family grounds are now the Nahant Country Club.

Frederic married Euphemia Fenno (April 6, 1814, Mount Upton, New York – March 9, 1884, Newbury, Vermont). His oldest son, Frederic (February 11, 1845 – 1902, Boston) was an 1867 graduate of Harvard College and a member of one of the first graduating classes at St. Paul's School in Concord, New Hampshire. The Ice King's second son, William, was also a graduate of St. Paul's School.

The younger Frederic was the grandfather of the 20th-century watercolorist and book illustrator Tasha Tudor (Frederic's daughter Rosamond married William Starling Burgess). She was born in Boston in 1915 and was named Starling Burgess for her father. Her father soon renamed her Natasha, after the character in "War and Peace". That name was later shortened to Tasha, and she adopted her mother's maiden name in her pen name when publishing her works.

== Death ==
Frederic Tudor died in Boston at his house on the northwest corner of Beacon and Joy Streets on Saturday, February 6, 1864. He was buried in the King's Chapel Burying Ground on Tremont Street in the Tudor family tomb (number thirteen), but his remains may later have been moved.
