= Harbin International Ice and Snow Sculpture Festival =

Annual winter festival in Harbin, China

Harbin Ice and Snow World
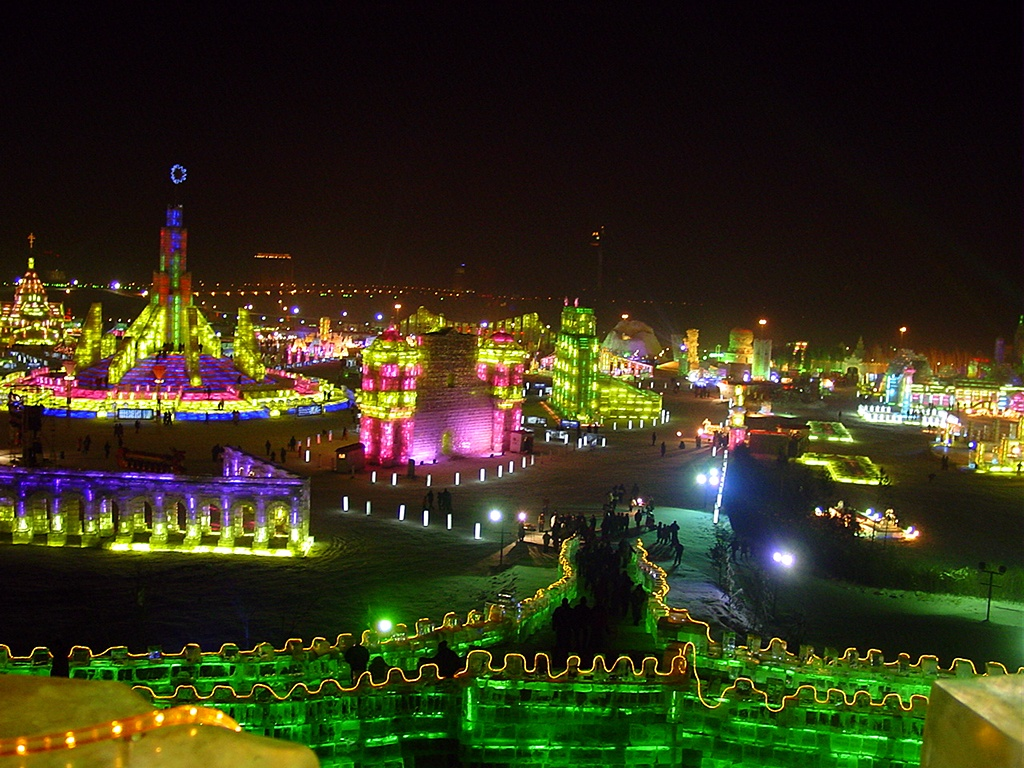
- During the 2003 festival
- Genre: Winter festival
- Locations: Harbin, China
- Coordinates: 45°46′42″N 126°33′23″E
- Years active: 1963–present

Harbin International Ice and Snow Sculpture Festival
- Traditional Chinese: 哈爾濱國際冰雪節
- Simplified Chinese: 哈尔滨国际冰雪节
Transcriptions
Standard Mandarin
- Hanyu Pinyin: Hā'ěrbīn Guójì Bīngxuě Jié

Harbin Ice and Snow World (Chinese: 哈尔滨冰雪世界; pinyin: Hā'ěrbīn Bīngxuě Shìjiè) is an annual winter festival that takes place in Harbin, Heilongjiang, China, and is now the largest ice and snow festival in the world. The festival includes the popular attraction Ice and Snow World (冰雪大世界). Initially, the festival primarily attracted Chinese participants. Over time, however, it has grown into an international event and competition, drawing 3.56 million visitors and generating 266.17 billion yuan ($36.71 billion) of revenue in 2025. The festival includes the world's biggest ice sculptures.

The festival exhibits open from late December to late February. While ice sculptures are erected throughout the city, there are two main exhibition areas:

- Sun Island is a recreational area on the opposite side of the Songhua River from the city, which features an expo of enormous snow sculptures.
- Ice and Snow World (冰雪大世界) is an area open in the afternoon and at night which features illuminated full size buildings made from blocks of 2–3' thick ice taken directly from the Songhua River. The park usually opens from late December to late February. In 1999, the first Ice and Snow World opened to public to celebrate the millennium. Each year the park has to be rebuilt with newly designed ice buildings and snow and ice sculptures. In 2025, the park covered 1.2 million square meters (120 hectares).

During the festival, there are ice lantern park touring activities held in many parks in the city. Winter activities during the festival include Yabuli alpine skiing, winter-swimming in the Songhua River, and the ice-lantern exhibition in Zhaolin Garden.

Harbin is located in Northeast China and receives cold winter wind from Siberia. The average temperature in summer is 21.2 °C (70.2 °F), and –16.8 °C (1.8 °F) in winter. Annual lows of -25 °C (–13 °F) are not uncommon.

== History ==
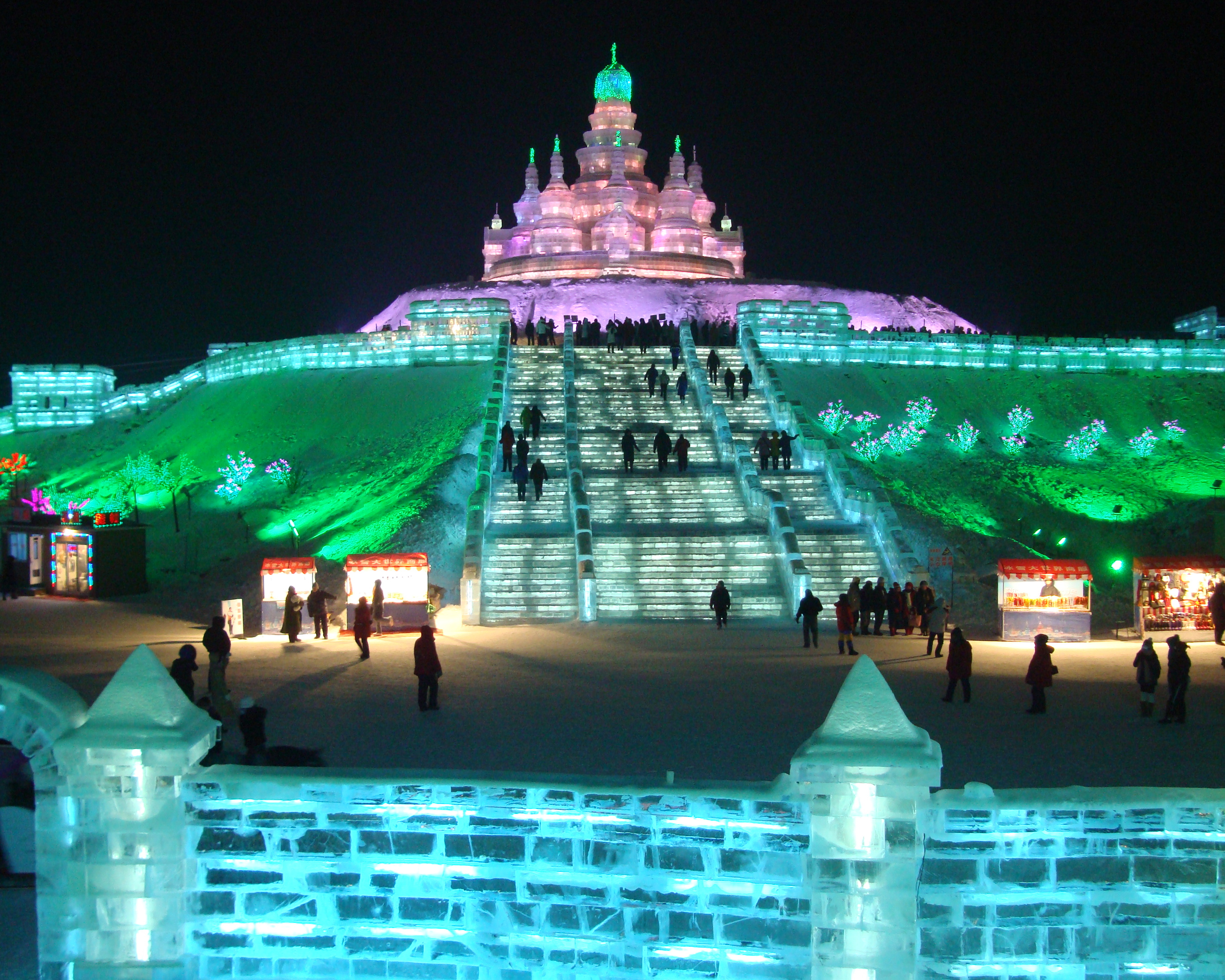
Ice sculpture erected in the 2010 Ice and Snow festival

The festival originated in Harbin's traditional ice lantern show and garden party that takes place in winter, which began in 1963. It was interrupted for a number of years during the Cultural Revolution, but has since been resumed when an annual event at Zhaolin Park was announced on January 5, 1985.

In 2001 the Harbin Ice Festival was merged with Heilongjiang's International Ski Festival and got its new formal name, the Harbin International Ice and Snow Sculpture Festival.

In 2007, the festival featured a Canadian themed sculpture, in memory of Canadian doctor Norman Bethune. It was awarded a Guinness World Record for the world's largest snow sculpture: 250 metres long, 28 feet (8.5 m) high, using over 13,000 cubic metres of snow. The composition consisted of two parts: the "Niagara Falls" and the "crossing the Bering Strait" (the latter depicting the migration of the First Nations).

In 2014, the festival celebrated its 30th anniversary with the theme "50-Year Ice Snow, Charming Harbin". Various fairs, competitions and expos were held from December 20, 2013, to February 28, 2014.

In 2015, the 31st Harbin Ice Snow Festival opened on January 5 and was themed "Ice Snow Harbin, Charming China Dreams around the world" with opening ceremony, firework show, ice lanterns, birthday parties, snow sculpture competitions and expos, as well as winter swimming, winter fishing, group wedding ceremony, fashion shows, concerts, ice sport games lasting from December 22, 2014, to early March 2015.

2019 Harbin International Ice and Snow Sculpture Festival

At the 35th annual festival held in 2019, the festival's most popular attraction, the Harbin Ice and Snow World, took up over 600,000 square meters and included more than 100 landmarks. It was made from 110,000 cubic meters of ice and 120,000 cubic meters of snow. The festival also included ice sculptures by artists from 12 different countries competing in the annual competition.

Celebrating its 36th year in 2020, this festival is presently viewed as one of the world's top winter celebrations, joining the ranks of the Sapporo Snow Festival in Japan, Canada's Quebec Winter Carnival and Norway's Holmenkollen Ski Festival. In 2020, the sculptures were produced using roughly 220,000 cubic meters of ice blocks, all pulled from the nearby Songhua River.

In 2021, the festival did not take place in full capacity due to the COVID-19 pandemic.

The festival was also part of the cultural program of the 2009 Winter Universiade and the 2025 Asian Winter Games. At the Asian Games, the cauldron was part of the festival's main plaza activities.

== Construction ==
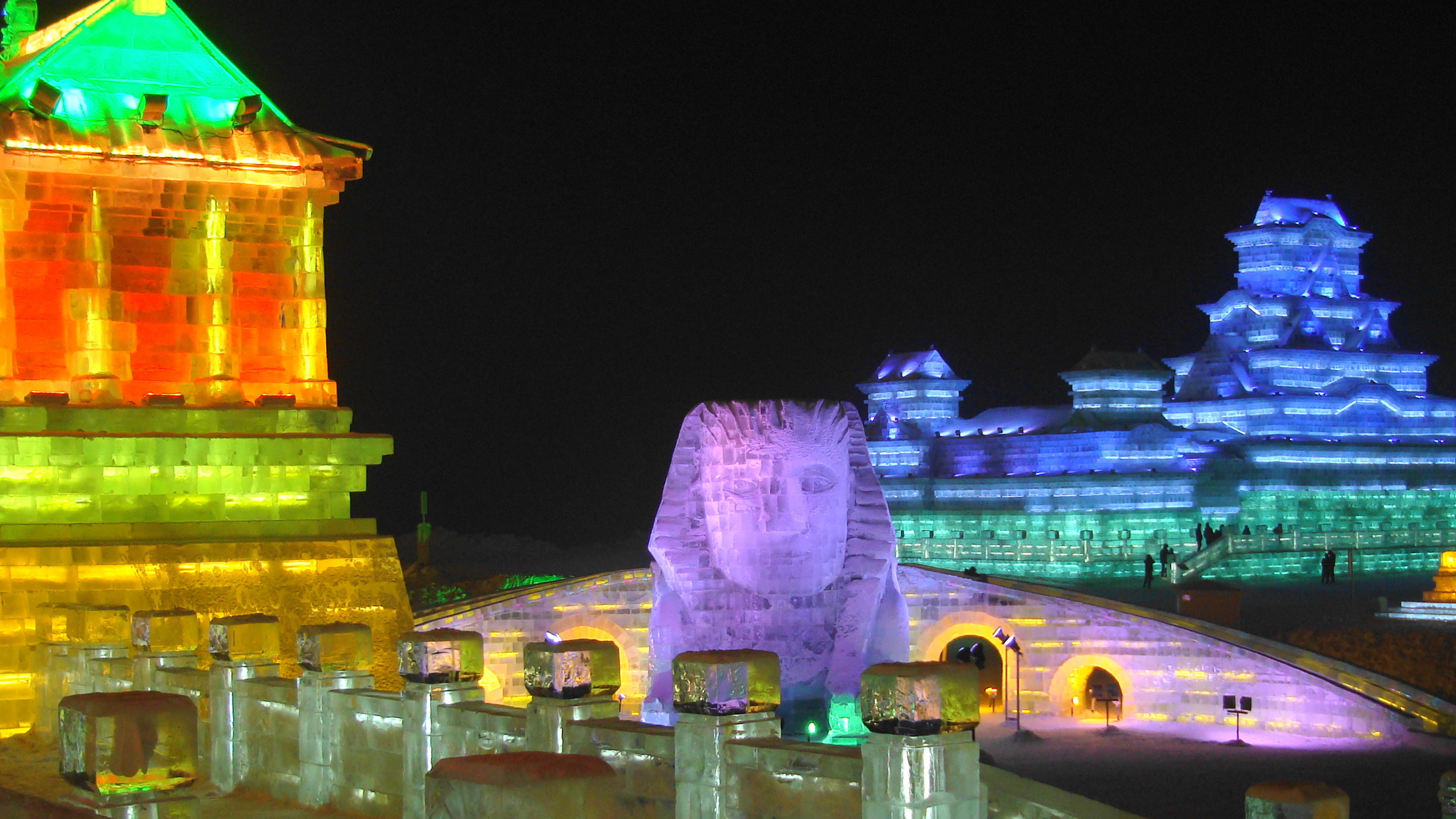
Ice sculpture of the Great Sphinx of Giza erected for the 2010 festival

Swing saws are used to carve ice into blocks, taken from the frozen surface of the Songhua River. Chisels, ice picks and various types of saws are then used by ice sculptors to carve out large scaled ice sculptures, many of them intricately designed and worked on all day and night prior to the commencement of the festival. Deionised water can also be used, producing ice blocks as transparent as glass to make clear sculptures rather than translucent ones. Multicoloured lights are also used to give colour to ice, creating variations on sculptured spectacles when lit up especially at night. Some ice sculptures made in previous years include: buildings and monuments of different architectural types and styles, figures including animals people and mythical creatures, slippery dips or ice slides and lanterns. Apart from winter recreational activities available in Harbin, these exquisitely detailed, mass-produced ice sculptures are the main draw card in attracting tourists around the world to the festival.

== Gallery ==
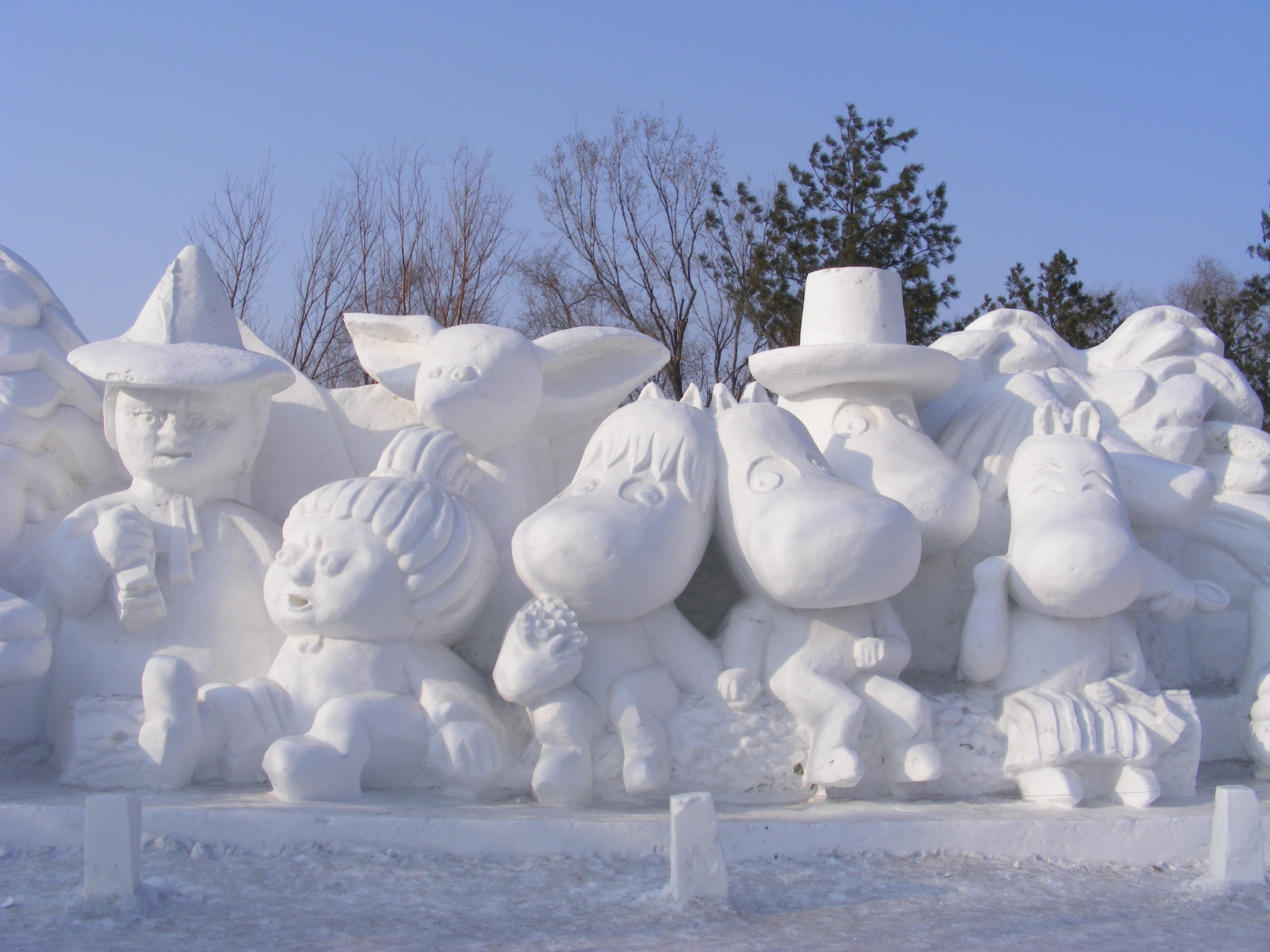
Moomins in Harbin International Ice and Snow Sculpture Festival 2009

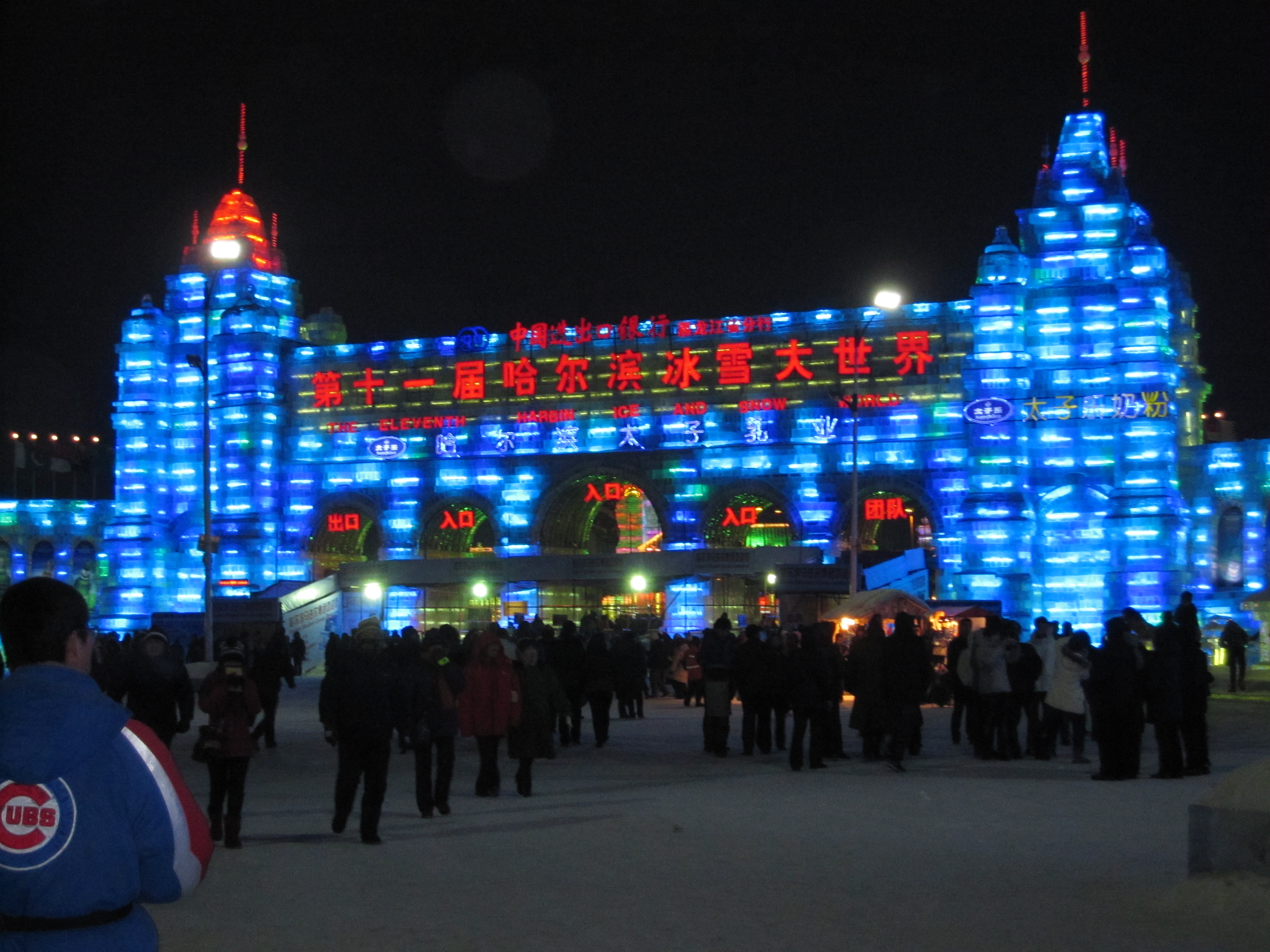
Harbin International Ice and Snow Sculpture Festival 2010

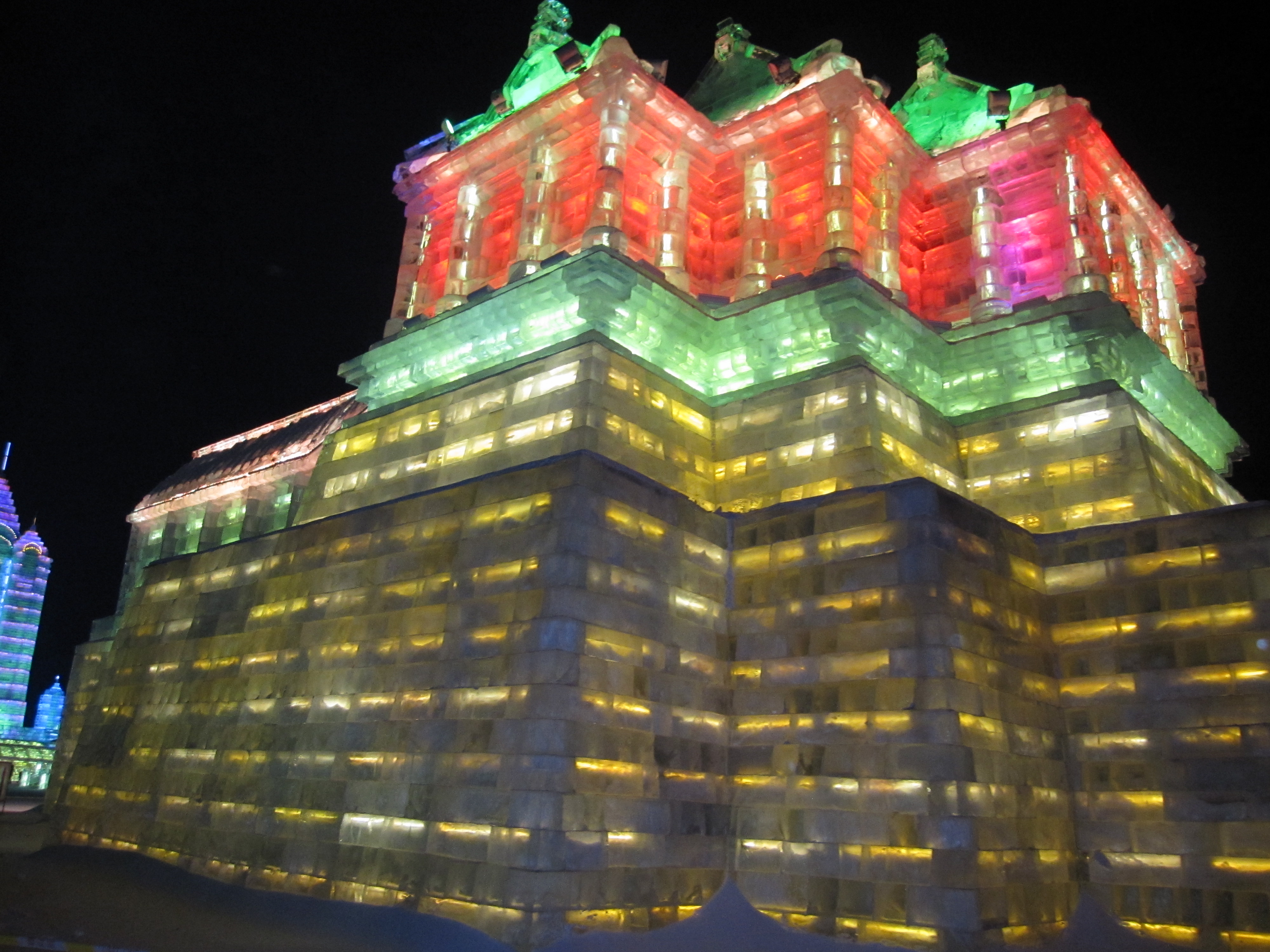
Harbin International Ice and Snow Sculpture Festival 2010

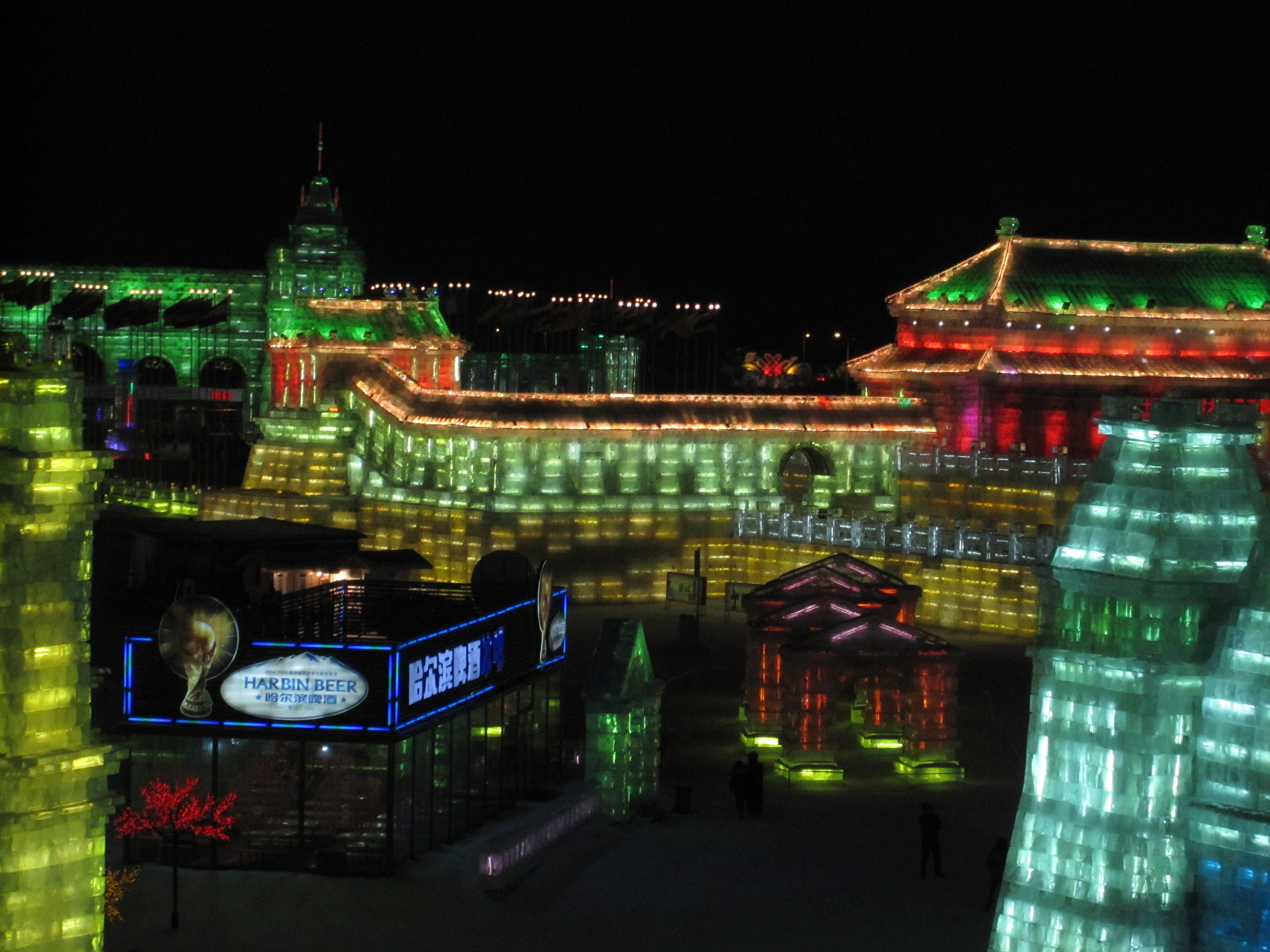
Harbin International Ice and Snow Sculpture Festival 2010

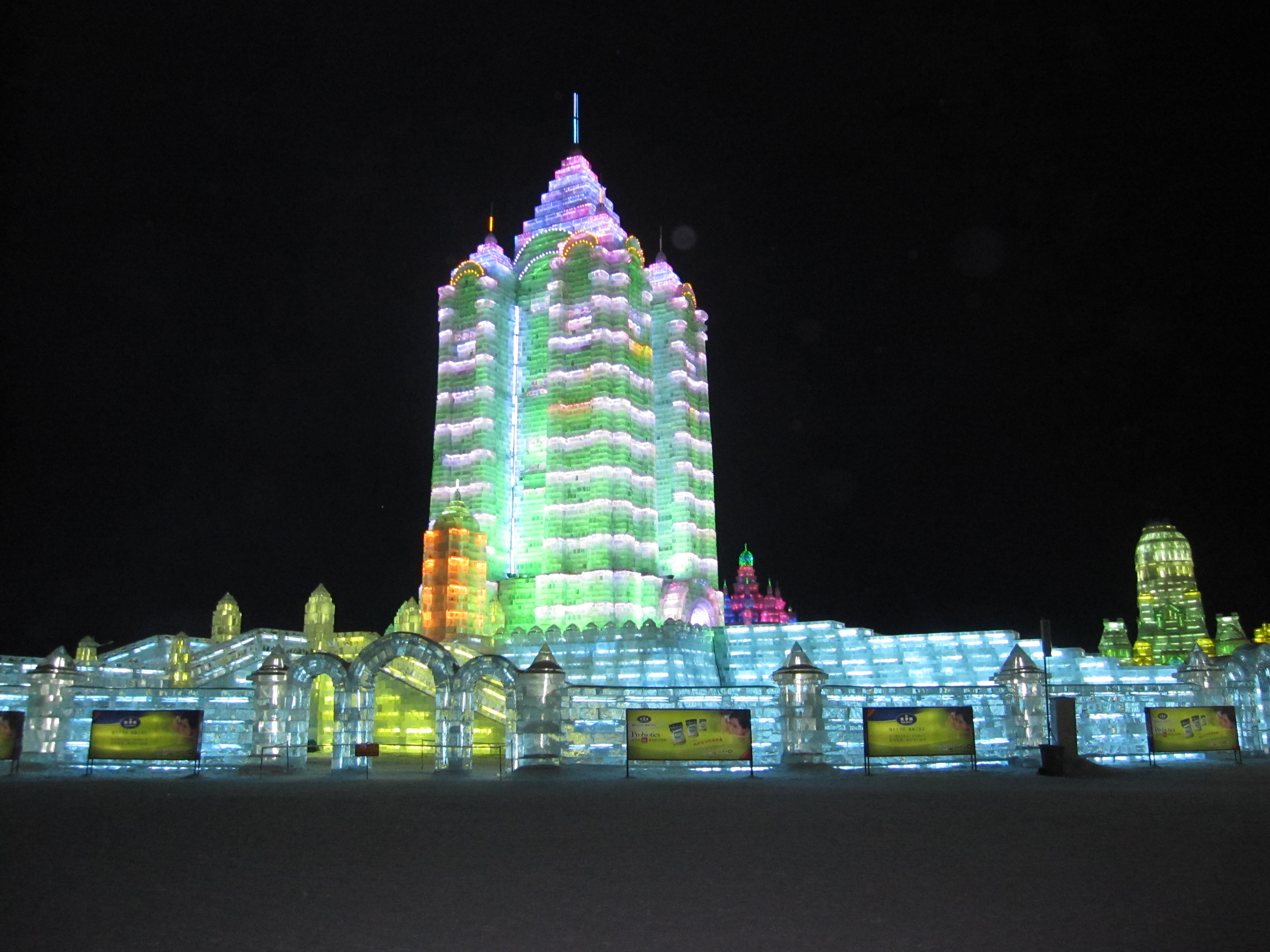
Harbin International Ice and Snow Sculpture Festival 2010

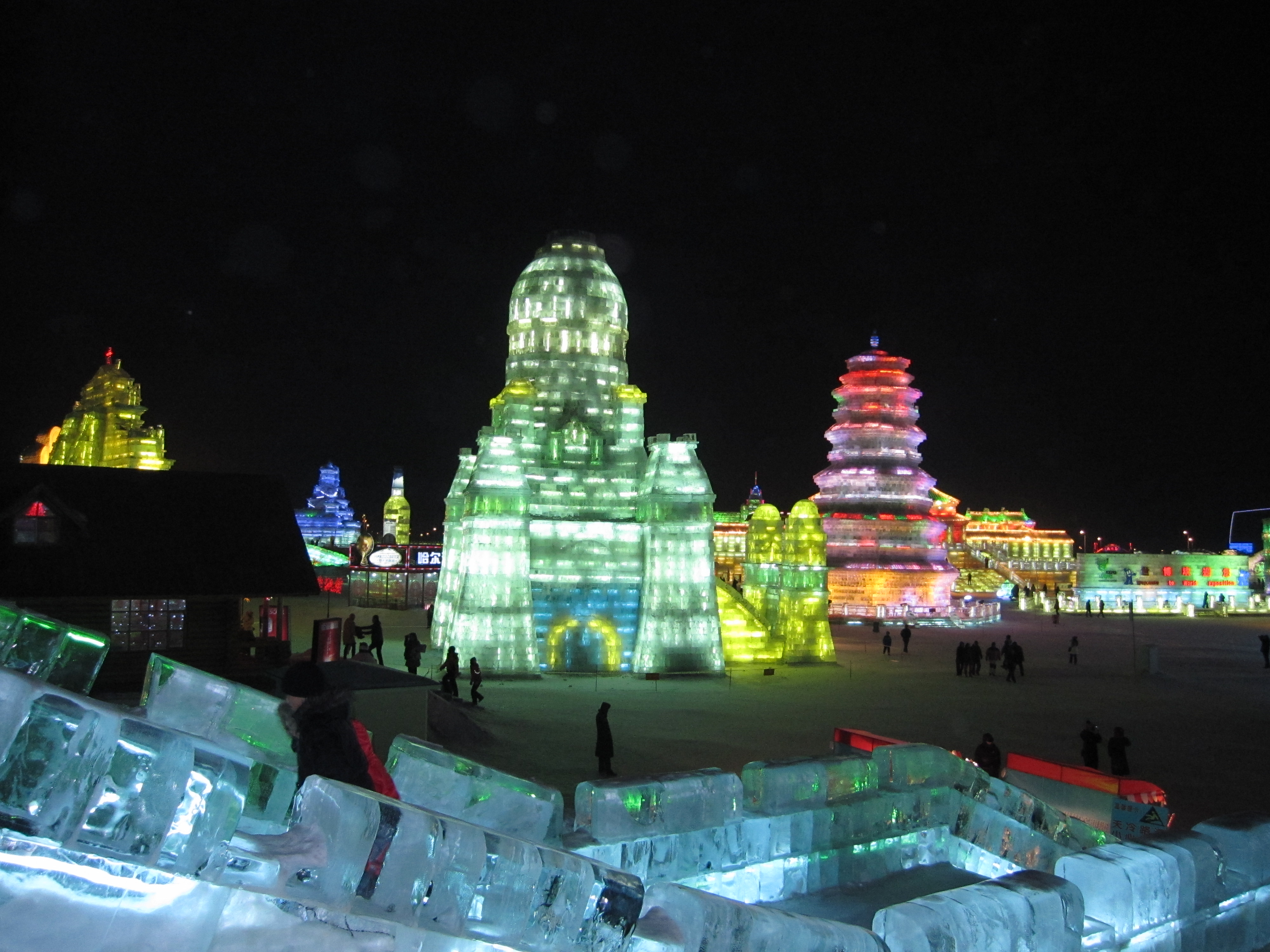
Harbin International Ice and Snow Sculpture Festival 2010

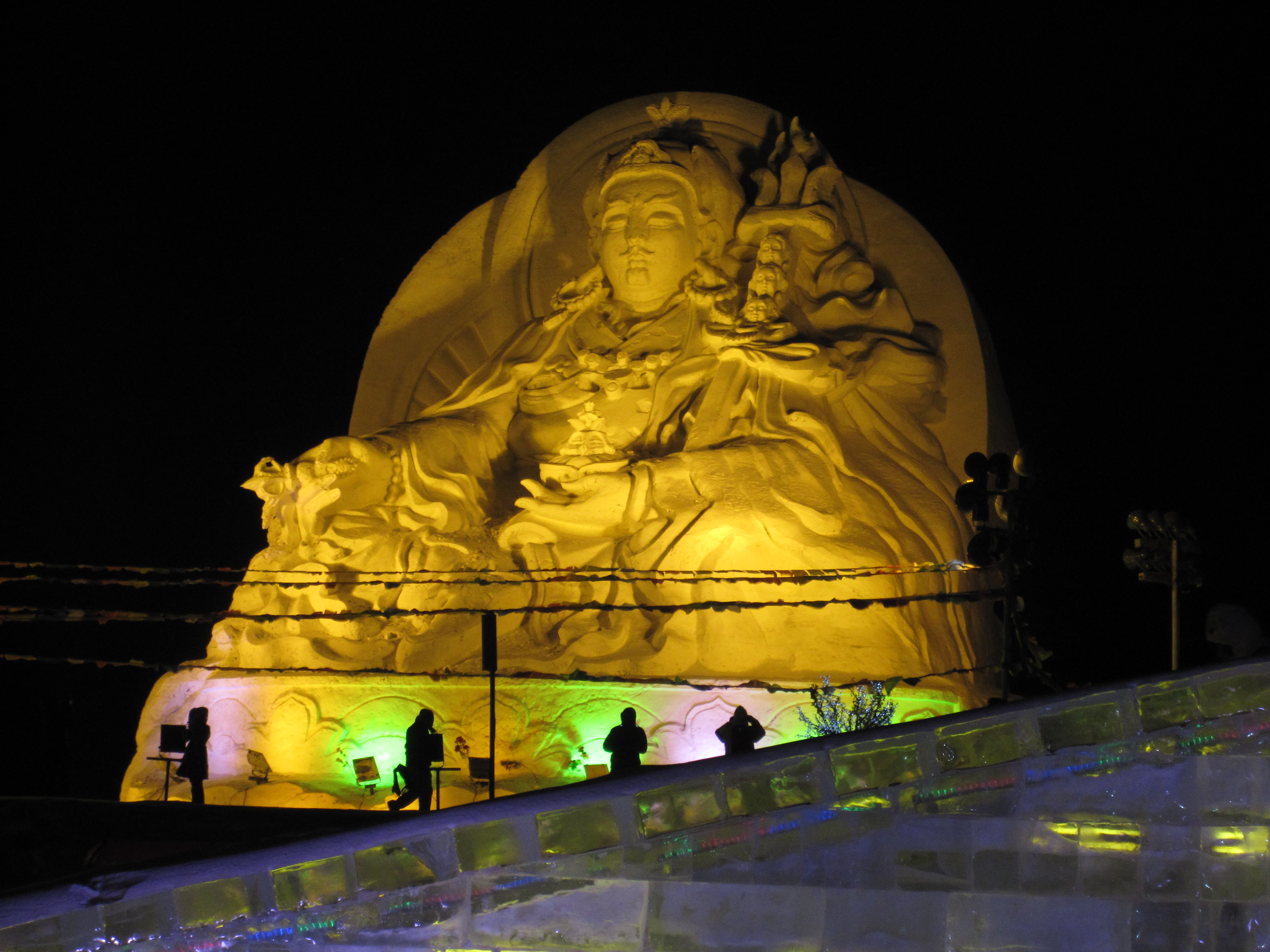
Harbin International Ice and Snow Sculpture Festival 2010

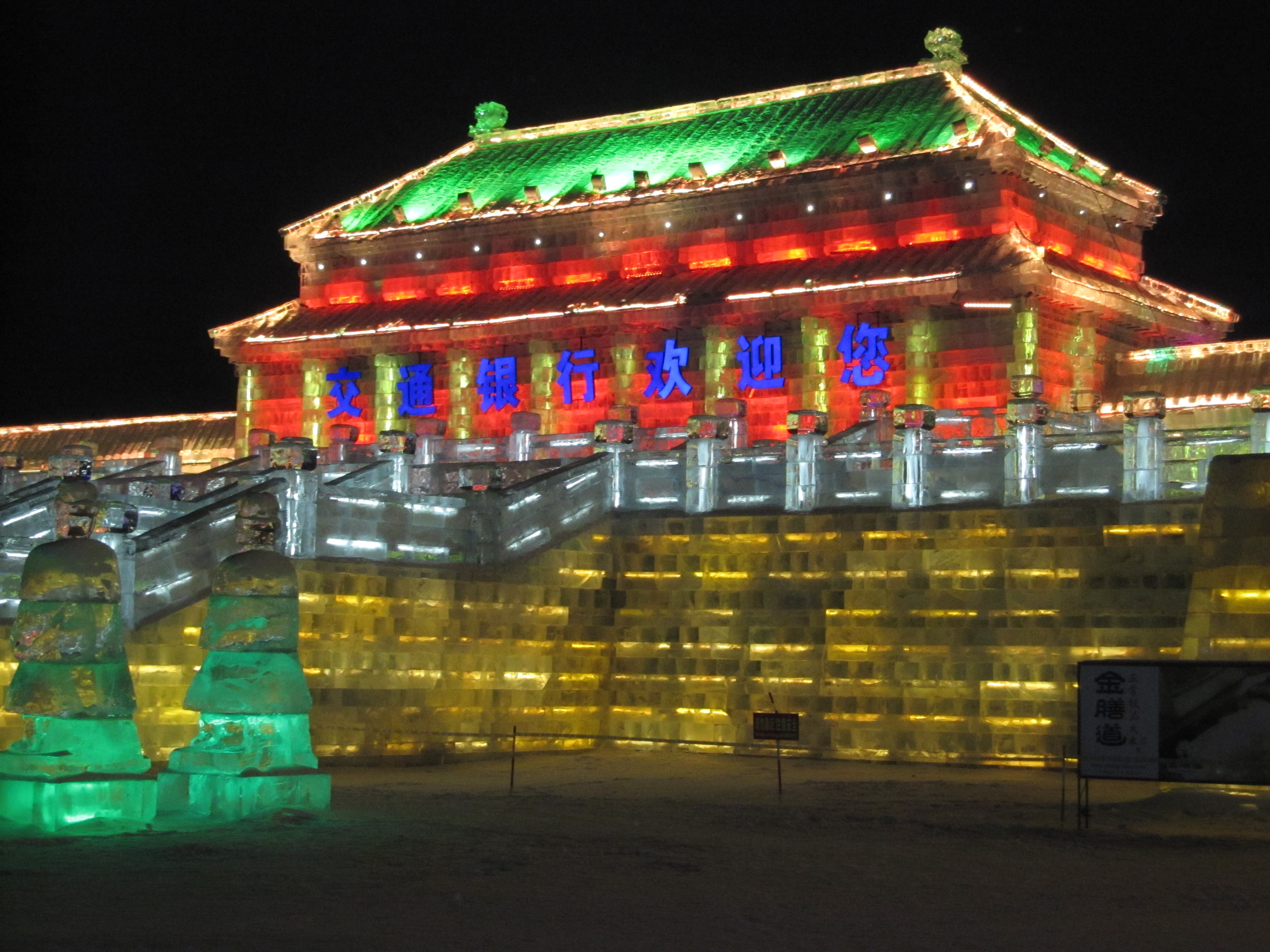
Harbin International Ice and Snow Sculpture Festival 2010

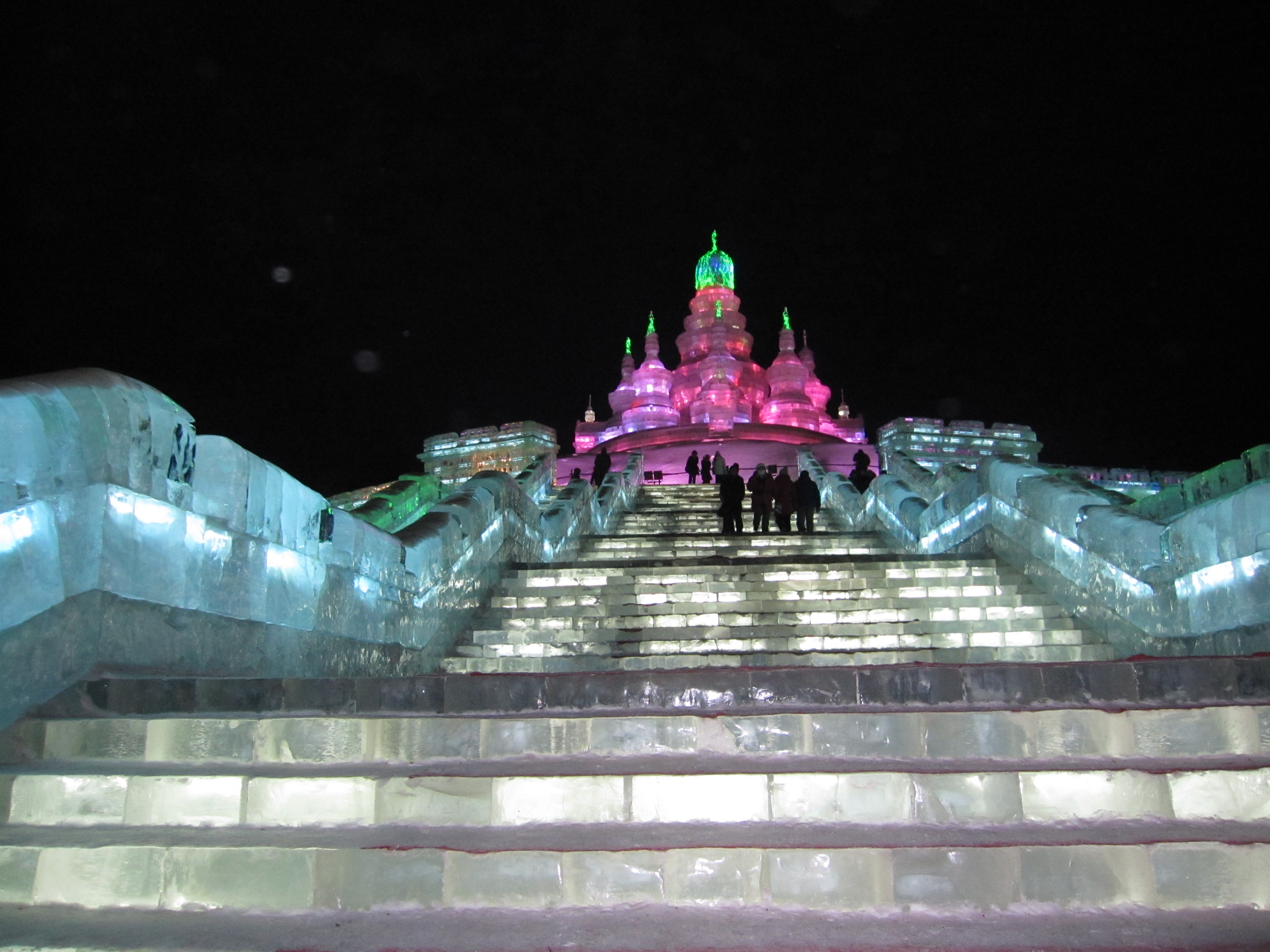
Harbin International Ice and Snow Sculpture Festival 2010

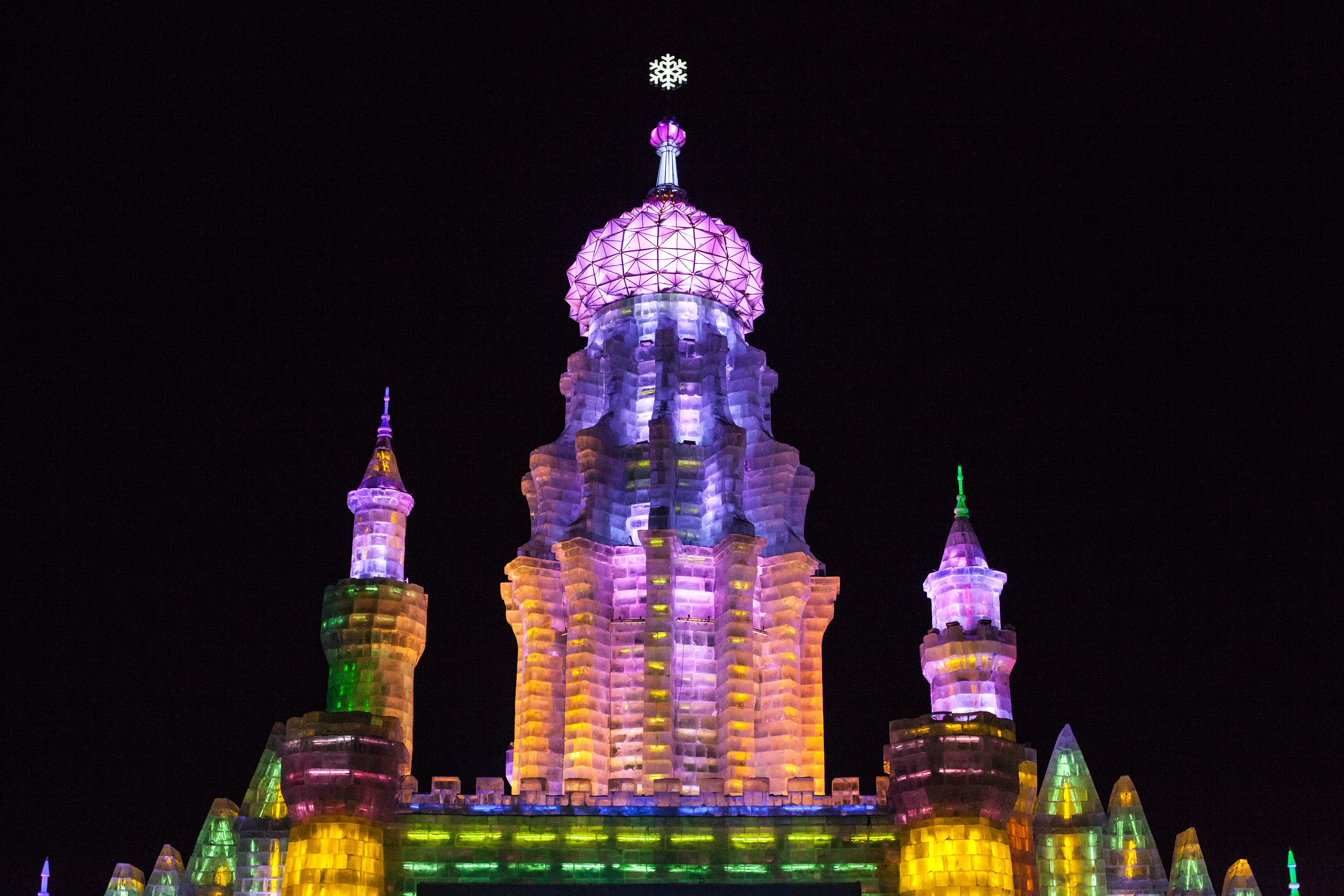
Ice and Snow Sculpture Festival 2013

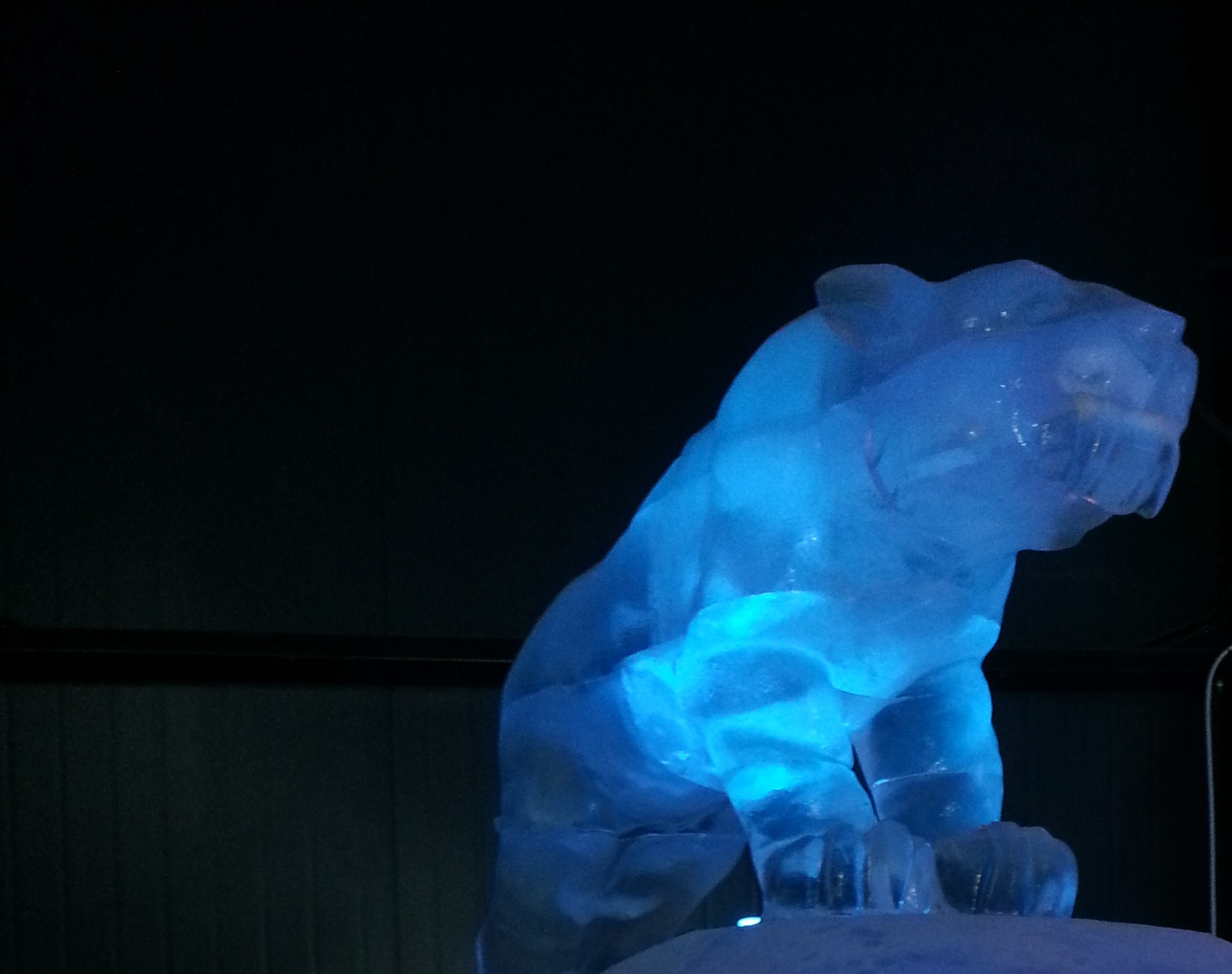
2014 Hong Kong Harbin Winter Festival Saber-toothed Cat

== See also ==
- Ice palace
