= Plywood saw =

A plywood saw is a saw that has a fine-toothed blade that minimizes tearing of the outer plies of a sheet of plywood. An extra set of teeth on the curved upper edge of the blade allows starting of a cut on the inside of a panel (away from the edge) without having to drill a starting hole. The standard plywood saw blade is 11 inches long and has 14 tpi (teeth per inch).

== Sources ==
- "Reader's Digest Book of Skills and Tools"
