= Frame saw =

Type of saw

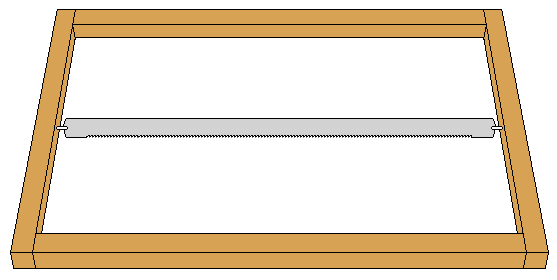
A diagram of a simple frame saw

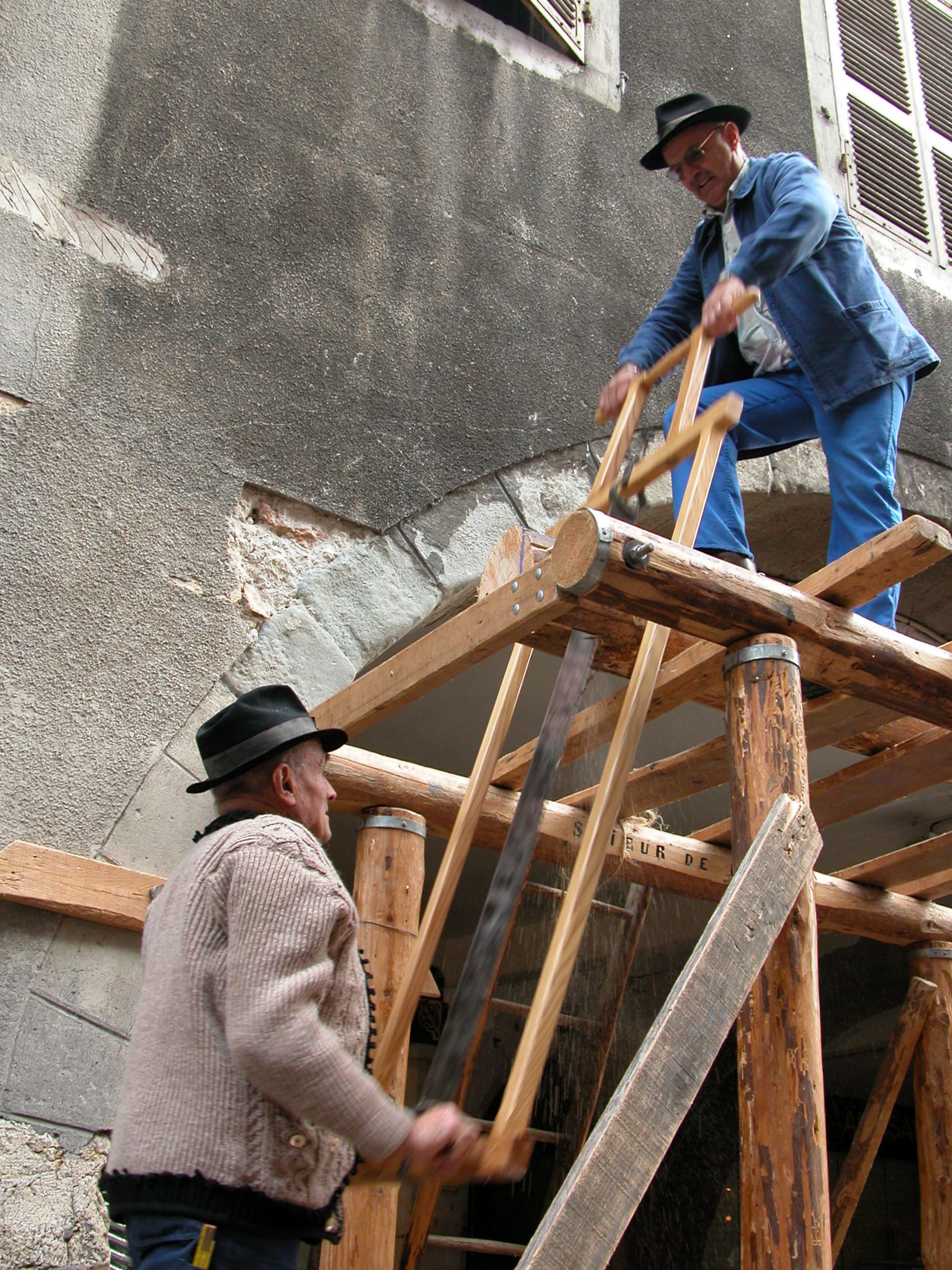
A large frame saw being used on trestles

A frame saw or sash saw is a type of saw which consists of a relatively narrow and flexible blade held under tension within a (generally wooden) rectangular frame (also called a sash or gate). They are used for cutting wood or stone. The blade is held perpendicular to the plane of the frame, so that the material being cut passes through the center of the frame. Frame saws for use with wood are rip saws operated as a hand saw or powered in a sawmill. Frame saws used for cutting stone were powered saws in stone mills.

When used for different purposes, a frame saw may have other names. For converting logs into lumber, they are also called a pit-saw or whipsaw. For sawing veneer, they may simply be called a veneer saw. It is unknown how early framed pit-saws came into use; however, there is an Italian fresco from c. 1300 depicting their use.

A more modern development from the 18th century is the open pit saw which resembled a large hand saw with no frame, a till for a handle at the top and a box for a lower handle. This form of pit saw is still manufactured, and in use in rural areas of developing countries as a means of processing timber.

The frame pit saw was the mainstay of resawing before stiff, unframed two-man saws called a muley or mulay saw, circular saws, and band saws took over. In some early sawmills a frame saw was powered from a water wheel, wind mill or other rotary motion through a crankshaft and connecting rod. Frame saws are now largely obsolete, although woodworkers who eschew power tools still make them for personal use in many sizes and styles of assembly.
