= Polesaw =

Saw mounted on a long pole, usually for pruning trees

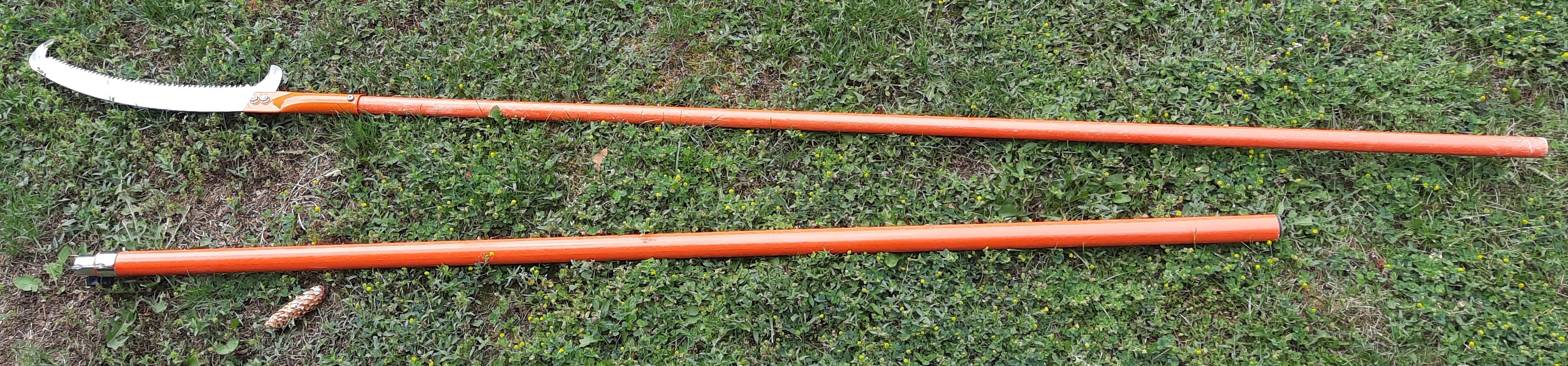
- A polesaw with an extra pole lying beside it

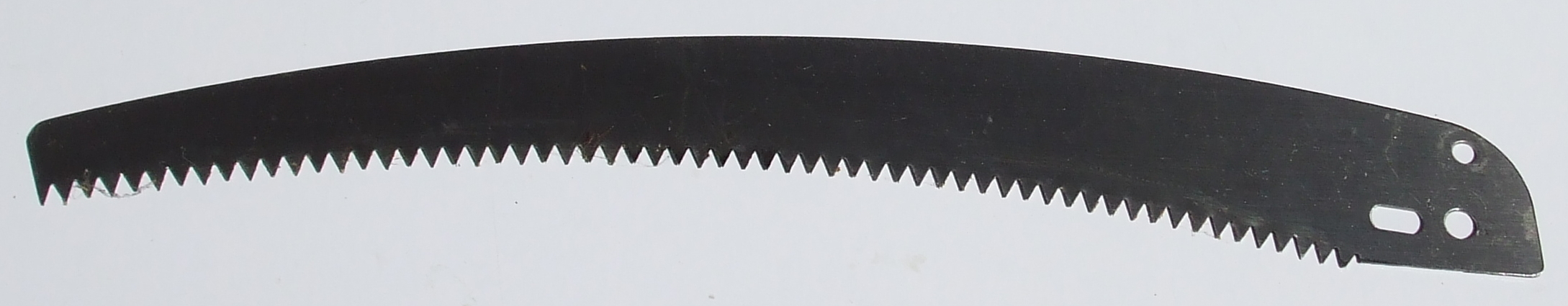
- A replacement blade
- Classification: Gardening, Pruning device
- Related: Chainsaw, saw

A polesaw (also pole saw or giraffe saw) is a saw attached to a pole or long handle that is used for pruning tree branches that are beyond arm's reach. A polesaw allows its user to cut high branches without the use of a ladder. Polesaws can be manual or motorized.

A polesaw is common equipment for phone- and powerline workers to prune tree limbs entangled with overhead cables, but the physical nature of the work can be a source of musculoskeletal injuries.
