= Ripsaw =

Type of saw for dividing wood along its grain

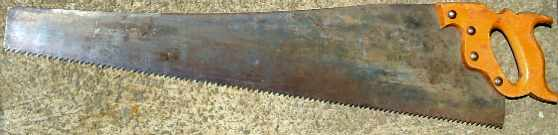
A ripsaw

A ripsaw (or rip saw) is a wood saw that is specially designed for making a rip cut, a cut made parallel to the direction of the wood grain.

== Design ==
The cutting edge of each tooth has a flat front edge and it is angled backward by about 8°, in contrast to a crosscut saw, which has teeth angled backward by about 15°.

With the "rip" tooth pattern, the edges are sharpened at right angles to the cutting plane, forming chisel-like cutting surfaces, whereas crosscut teeth are sharpened at an angle, so that each tooth has a knife-like cutting point in contact with the wood. This design keeps the saw from following grain lines, which could curve the path of the saw: by acting like a chisel, the saw can more easily cut across deviating grain lines, which is necessary if a straight cut is to be achieved. This feature enables the orthogonal cutting edge to efficiently transport wood-chips from the kerf, allowing subsequent teeth to perform a more effective cut.

Ripsaws typically have 4–10 teeth per inch, making them relatively coarse.

== Use ==
All sawmills use ripsaws of various types including the circular saw and band saw. Historically sawmills used one or more reciprocating saws more specifically known as an "up-and-down" or "upright saw" which are of two basic types, the frame saw or a muley (mulay) saw which is similar to the hand powered pit saw. Some sawmills also use crosscut saws to cut boards and planks to length.

== Cutting styles ==
On the vast majority of saws throughout the world, the teeth are designed to cut when the saw is being pushed through the wood (on the push stroke or down stroke). However, some saws (such as Japanese saws and the saws used by Ancient Egyptians) are designed to cut on the pull stroke.
