= Pendulum saw =

Type of circular saw

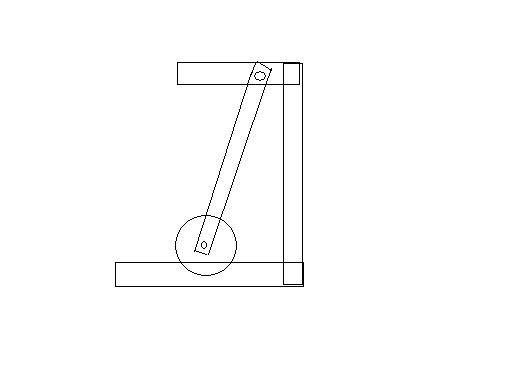
Pendulum saw or swing saw, side view, a circular saw hung from a swinging arm, for cross cutting wood. Shown in the cutting position

A pendulum saw or swing saw is a mechanically powered circular saw with the blade mounted so it can swing into the material.

== Operation ==
A swing saw is used for cross cutting wood in a sawmill, or for cutting ice off of a frozen body of waters. The saw is hung on a swinging arm, sometimes with a counterbalance weight.

A swing saw is also sometimes called a cut-off trim saw in a mill for cutting right angle to the direction of the wood grain. A swing saw is a very dangerous tool, even with a blade guard. Early models were driven by a belt, usually made of leather, that was powered by a water mill or later a steam engine. Today the power source is an electric motor or a gas engine

== Harbin International Ice and Snow Sculpture Festival ==
Swing saws are used to carve ice blocks from the frozen Songhua River for the Harbin International Ice and Snow Sculpture Festival each year.

== See also ==
- Saw chain
- Saw pit
- Sharpening
- Two-man saw
- Watersaw
- Diamond tools
- Ice hotel
- Ice palace
