= Sawgrass =

Sawgrass may refer to:

- Saw grass, a common name of some species of plants in the genus Cladium
- Sawgrass, Florida, a town in the United States
- Sawgrass Country Club, a private golf and tennis club located in Ponte Vedra Beach, Florida
- Sawgrass Expressway, Florida State Road 869
- Sawgrass Lake Park, a park located in Pinellas County, Florida
- Sawgrass Lake, a lake in Brevard County, Florida, United States
- Sawgrass Mills in Sunrise, Florida; the world's largest outlet mall
- TPC at Sawgrass, a golf course in Ponte Vedra Beach, Florida, United States; the golf course hosts The Players Championship
