= MSRI =

MSRI may refer to:

- Malaysian Social Research Institute, Kuala Lumpur, assists refugees
- Market Systems Resilience Index, measures the capacity of a market system to adapt and adjust to shocks
- Mathematical Sciences Research Institute, California, undertakes research in mathematics
