= Treadle =

Mechanism converting reciprocating into rotating motion

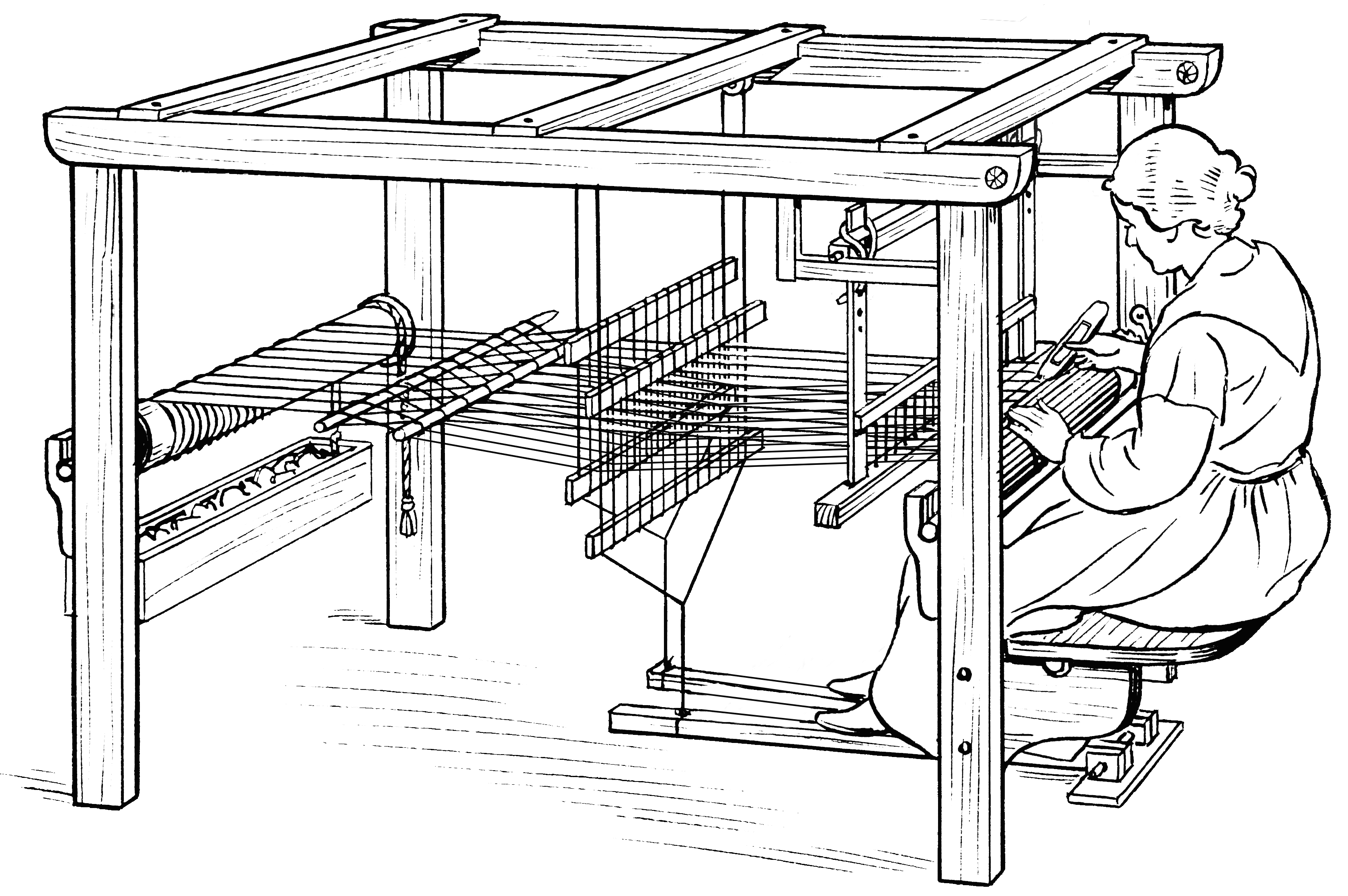
A treadle loom; the treadles raise and lower the two heddles. The heddles are connected by a rope over the heddle pulleys, so that they rise and fall alternately. One treadle is attached to the bottom of each heddle.

A treadle (from Old English: tredan, "to tread") is a foot-powered lever mechanism; it is operated by treading on it repeatedly. A treadle, unlike some other types of pedals, is not directly mounted on the crank (see treadle bicycle for a clear example).

Most treadle machines convert reciprocating motion into rotating motion, using a mechanical linkage to indirectly connect one or two treadles to a crank. The treadle then turns the crank, which powers the machine. Other machines use treadles directly, to generate reciprocating motion. For instance, in a treadle loom, the reciprocating motion is used directly to lift and lower the harnesses or heddles; a common treadle pump uses the reciprocating motion to raise and lower pistons.

Before the widespread availability of electric power, treadles were the most common way to power a range of machines. They are still widely used as a matter of preference and necessity. A human-powered machine gives the human operator close, instinctive control over the rate at which energy is fed into the machine; this lets them easily vary the rate at which they work. Treadle-operated machines are also used in environments where electric power is not available to power electric machinery.

Other, similar mechanisms for allowing human and animal muscle to power machines are cranks, treadmills, treadwheels, and kick wheels like a potter's kick wheel.

== Operation and uses ==
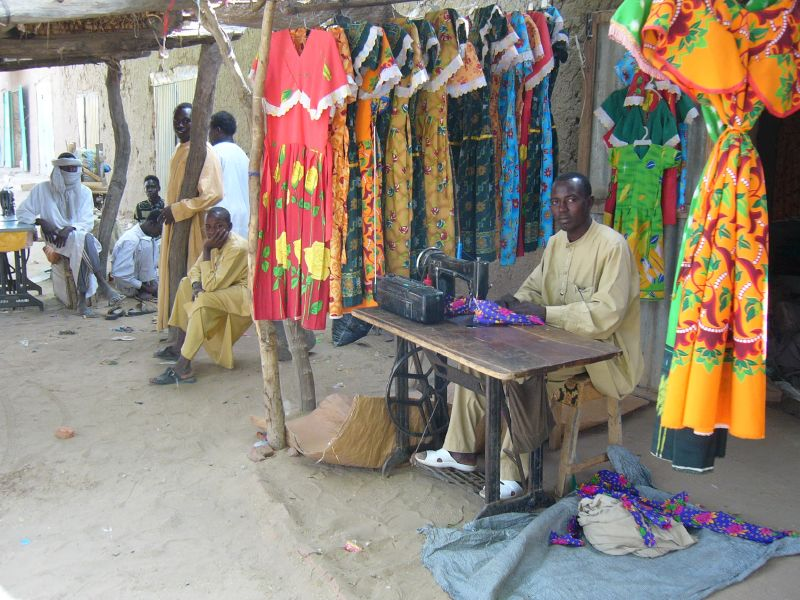
A tailor in Chad with a treadle sewing machine

A treadle is operated by pressing down on it repeatedly with one or both feet, causing a rocking motion. This movement can then be stored as rotational motion via a crankshaft driving a flywheel. Alternatively, energy can be stored in a spring, as in the pole lathe.

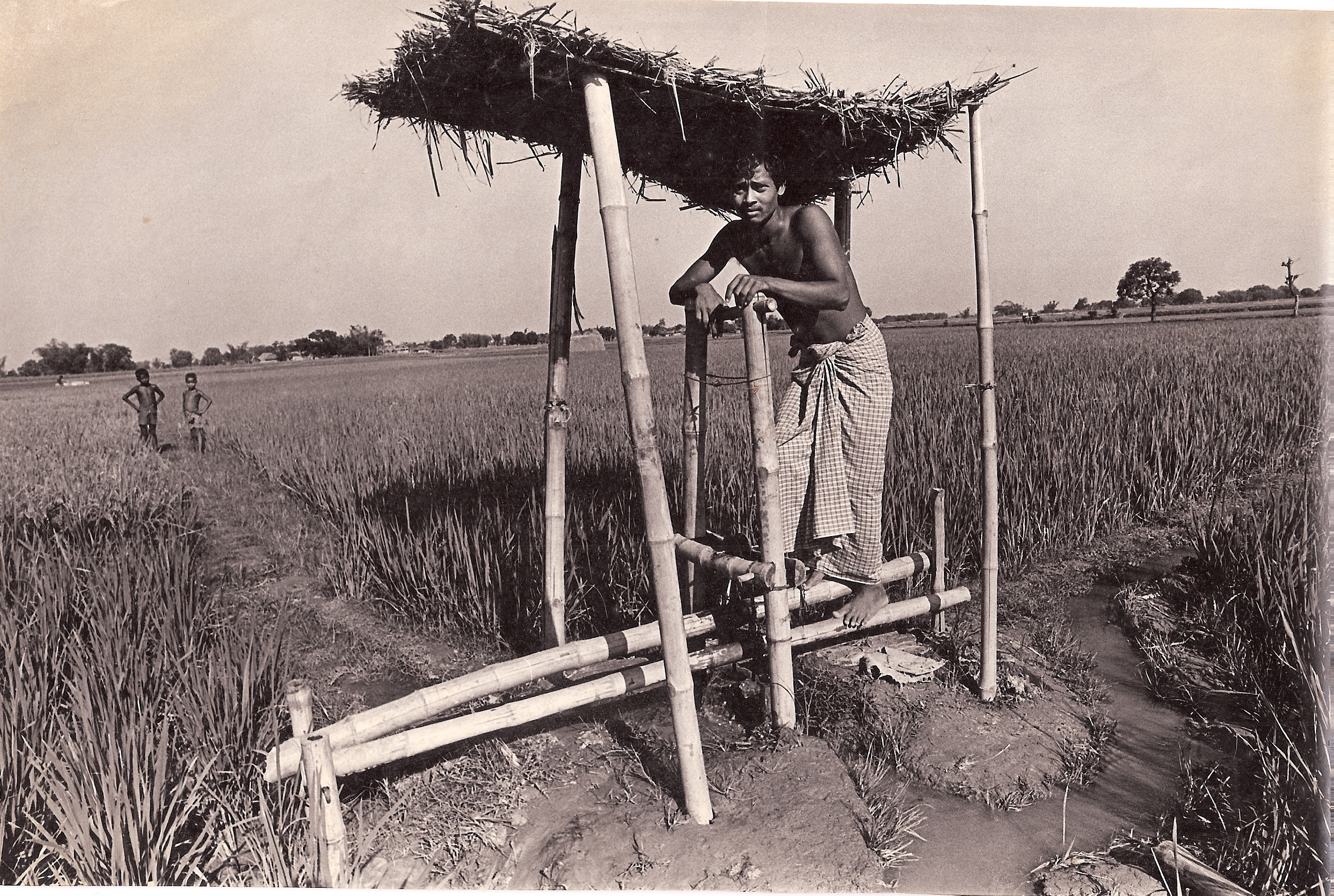
A homemade treadle pump in use in Bangladesh

Treadles were once used extensively to power most machines including lathes, rotating or reciprocating saws, spinning wheels, looms, and sewing machines.

Today the use of treadle-powered machines is common in areas of the developing world where other forms of power are unavailable. It is also common among artisans, hobbyists and historical re-enactors.

Some treadle looms in Africa and South Asia use toggles on a string as treadles. The toggles are held between the weaver's toes.

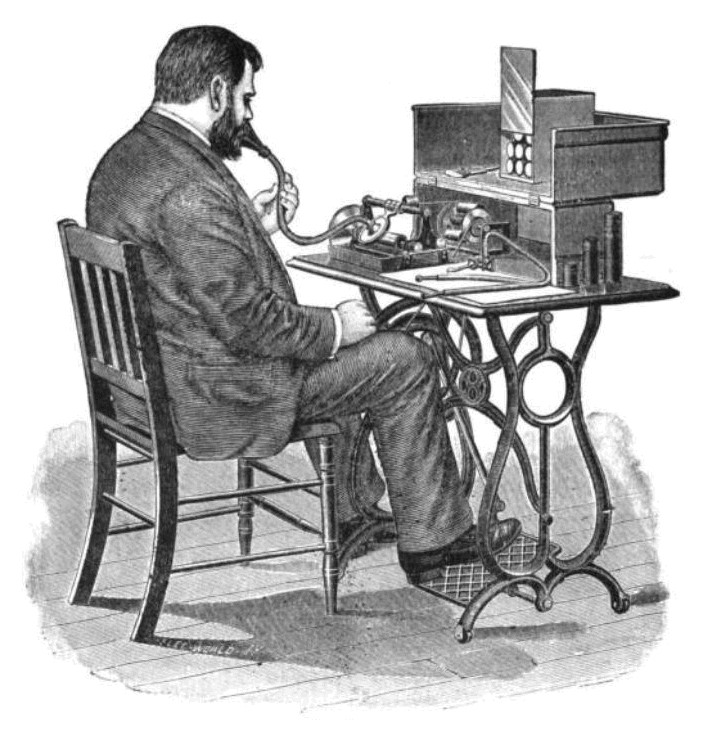
Dictation using a treadle-powered cylinder phonograph, circa 1897

== See also ==
- Bicycle pedal
- Treadle bicycle
- Treadle pump
- Sewing machine
