= John Hoersch House =

Historic house in Iowa, United States

- U.S. National Register of Historic Places
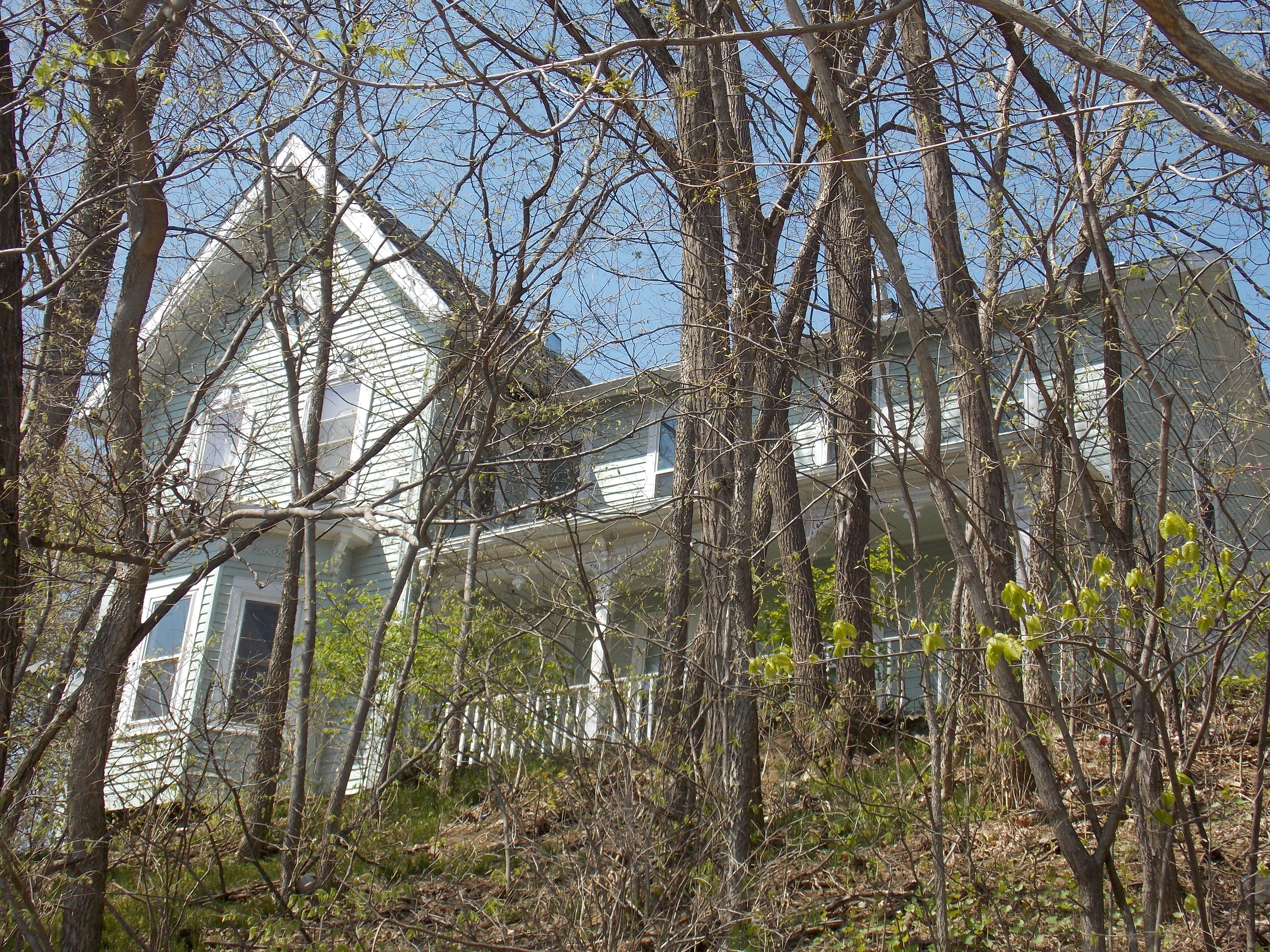

- Location within Iowa Location within the United States
- Location: 716 Vine St. Davenport, Iowa
- Coordinates: 41°31′37.89″N 90°35′16.06″W
- Area: less than one acre
- Built: 1879
- MPS: Davenport MRA
- NRHP reference No.: 84000304
- Added to NRHP: November 1, 1984

The John Hoersch House is a historic building located in the West End of Davenport, Iowa, United States. Hoersch moved to Scott County in the 1850s. He built this house in 1879 and lived here until the 1890s. The Vernacular-style house follows the T-plan farmhouse. It is a common style in Iowa and throughout the Midwestern United States, but it is unusual in an urban setting. It features a jigsaw-work porch on the front. The residence has been listed on the National Register of Historic Places since 1984.
