= Ida Benedetto =

Ida Benedetto may refer to:

- Ida Di Benedetto, Italian actress and film producer
- Ida Benedetto (designer), immersive artist
