= Sensa =

Sensa is a Latin word that means "thought" or "teachings".

Sensa may also refer to:

- Sensa (diet), a diet aid created by neurologist Alan Hirsch
- The Story of Sensa, a work by Mabel Collins
- Sensa, a character in the interactive fiction game Suspended
