= Tropical agriculture =

Agriculture in the tropics

Graph of crop production in tropical countries. Raw data from the United Nations.

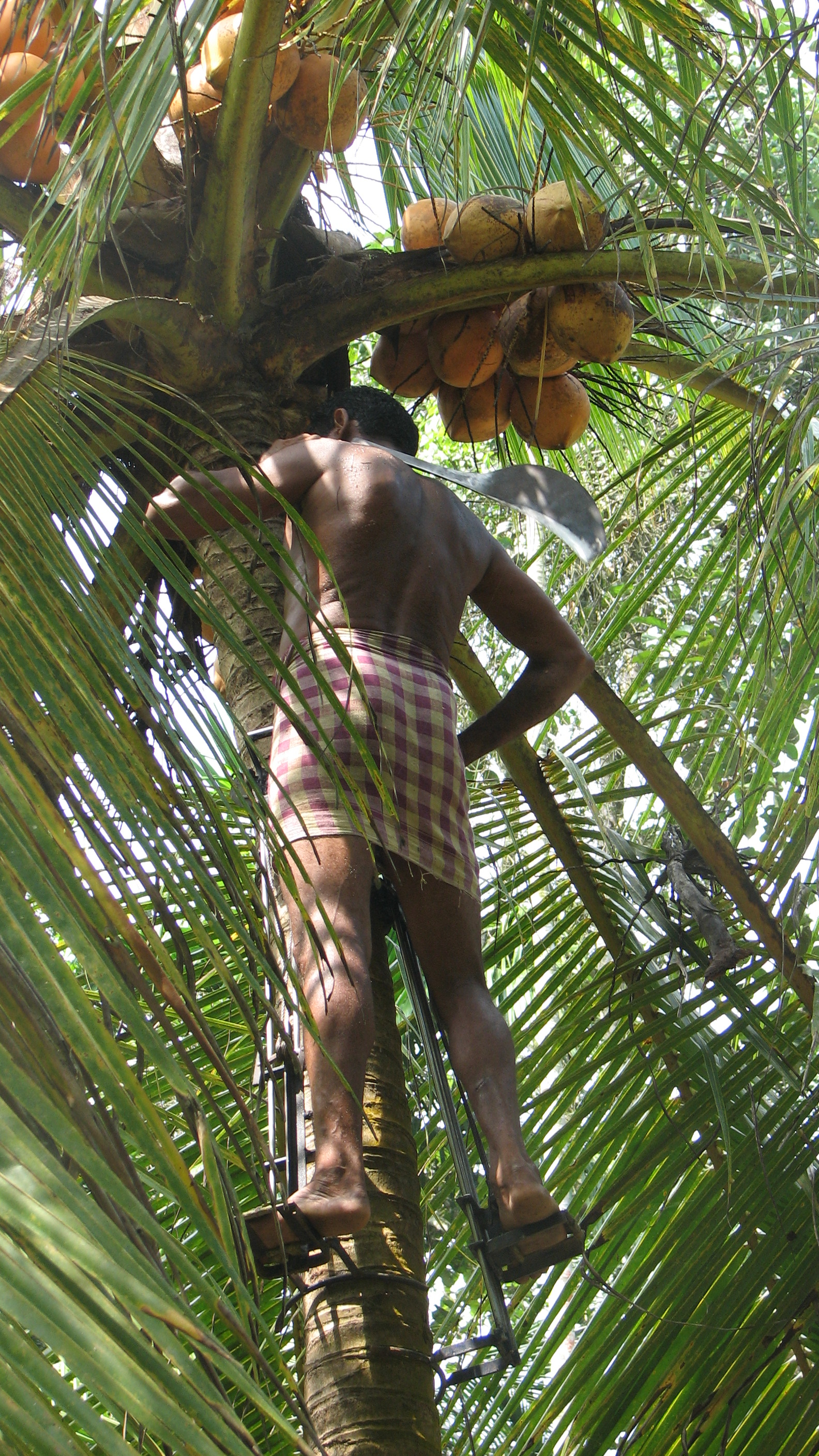
Coconut plucking in Kerala, India by using Coconut Tree Climber.

Worldwide more human beings gain their livelihood from agriculture than any other endeavor; the majority are self-employed subsistence farmers living in the tropics. While growing food for local consumption is the core of tropical agriculture, cash crops (normally crops grown for export) are also included in the definition.

When people discuss the tropics, it is normal to use generalized labels to group together similar tropical areas. Common terms would include the humid-tropics (rainforests); the arid-tropics (deserts and dry areas); or monsoon zones (those areas that have well defined wet/dry seasons and experience monsoons). Such labeling is very useful when discussing agriculture, because what works in one area of the world will normally work in a similar area somewhere else, even if that area is on the opposite side of the globe.

Most temperate zone agricultural techniques are inappropriate for tropical areas. The second half of the 20th century saw many attempts to duplicate in the tropics farming practices that had been successful in temperate climates. Due to differences in climate, soils, and patterns of land ownership, these largely failed. When they did succeed they tended to heavily favor farmers with substantial land holdings, as a high percentage of temperate agricultural practices are economically "scale-based" and favor large scale production. This in turn pushed many small-scale farmers on to ever more marginal land, as the better quality land was consolidated into larger farms.

== Green Revolution ==
The "Green Revolution" was an agricultural improvement program undertaken in the tropics. Funded initially by the Rockefeller Foundation, it aimed to improve corn, rice, and other cereal cultivators – breeding plants that would produce more grain for the same amount of effort.

From that point, it expanded out to improved basic farming practices, particularly for rice farmers. The growth of crop yields was such that agriculture was able to outstrip population growth — per capita production increased every year following 1950 - with Asia leading the way. The total cost of the Green Revolution by 1990 was about US$100 million.

The Green Revolution had a flaw; although the crops gave more yield, they were more subject to disease, since this was not a primary concern of the program. To address this problem together with an approach to more small-scale farming crops, substantial interest exists today in creating a second Green Revolution, based on sustainable agricultural practices and geared towards (small-scale) farmers with limited financial resources.

== Plant propagation ==
Many tropical food plants are propagated by cuttings. Seeds are necessary for plant embryos to survive the winter and other harsh conditions such as drought. However, where the weather is normally conducive to growth year-round, plants reproducing plants through means other than seeds is often advantageous. By bypassing the seed stage, plants can greatly accelerate their reproductive cycles. Despite this, anyone who wishes so, may still grow tropical crops, e.g., fruits, from seeds. To do so, some special seed germination techniques to germinate them more quickly may be best used.

== Plant defenses ==
Plants faced conflicting evolutionary pressures: the need to attract pollinators and seed dispensers, and to minimize the damage caused by herbivores. Many (tropical) plants use toxins to protect themselves. Cassava, one of the most important tropical food crops, produces cyanide upon ingestion unless processed to remove/reduce the cyanide content. Other plants are high in oxalates (the agent that binds calcium to form kidney stones); castor beans are the source of ricin, one of the most powerful poisons in existence; and velvet beans contain 3.1-6.1% L-DOPA, which can be toxic in large quantities. The list of toxic plants is long, but toxicity does not always mean a particular plant should be avoided, the knowledge needed to render toxic plants safe to use already exists in most communities.

== Slash/mulch ==
The contents of a bag of commercial fertilizer is described in terms of NPK -nitrogen (N), phosphorus (P) and potassium (K); with nitrogen being the main component of most commercial fertilizers.

Oxygen is only a small part of the air; the largest component of air is nitrogen. Nitrogen compounds are the main building block of protein; muscle in mammals and plant tissue in plants. If the level of nitrogen compounds in the soil is increased, plant growth can be significantly increased. Legumes are a group of plants that interact with bacteria (rhizobia) in the soil to fix nitrogen from the air into usable compounds, and deposit them into the soil where it is available for other plants to use. The nitrogen compounds deposited by legumes can be readily converted into larger harvests. However, one study of tree growth in the tropics disputes this showing Nitrogen-fixing trees are associated with reduced growth .

Green manures are plants grown to improve the soil, suppress weeds, limit erosion, and — when legumes are used — to increase the nitrogen content of the soil. The most common type of green manure used in the tropics is velvet bean. It produces a thick blanket of vines and leaves that in addition to infusing the soil with nitrogen, also smothers most weeds. It has reasonable tolerance to drought, low soil fertility, and highly acidic soil. Alternatives to the velvet bean include the lablab bean, the jack bean, and for use above 500 m altitude, the scarlet runner bean.

Once the blanket is several centimeters thick, it is chopped down with a machete, and the vines are chopped up. This produces thick mulch on top of the ground that both inhibits weed growth and adds vital nutrients to the soil. Corn or other crops are then planted directly into this mulch.

Slash/mulch is popular in southern Mexico, Guatemala, and Honduras; and in recent years has gained a following in many areas of the tropics, from Brazil to central Africa. Where it has been embraced, it has pushed aside slash-and-burn agriculture, and allowed farmers to use the same land continuously for many years.

Cornell University has taken a leading role in researching the effects of mulches and slash/mulch practices in the tropics.

== Small-scale irrigation ==
In most places in the tropics sufficient precipitation occurs to grow enough food to feed the local population; however, it may not fall in a timely or convenient manner. Making maximum use of the water that does fall is an ongoing challenge.

Water is a particularly important issue in dryland farming. The ability to collect and store water at a low cost and without damaging the environment, is what opens up deserts and other arid regions to farmers. When it rains in dryland areas, the rain storms are normally heavy, and the soil unable to absorb the large amounts of rain that comes down. This leads to excessive surface run-off that needs to be captured and retained.

Commercial farms growing cash crops often use irrigation techniques similar to or identical to what would be found on large scale commercial farms located in temperate regions; as an example, the Israeli drip-irrigation lines.

=== Water harvesting pits ===
One of the simplest forms of irrigation - the farmer digs bathtub-sized pits into his fields and lines them with plastic sheets to collect rainwater. Then, once the dry season sets in, the farmer uses the collected water to irrigate his crops. The technique is especially useful in mountainous areas, where rapid run-off otherwise occurs.

During years with normal precipitation, the growing season can be increased by an extra month or more by using harvesting pits. An extra month in many places means an extra crop can be grown. For instance, if the local growing season is 5 months long, and the farmers' main crops take 3 or 4 months to grow, an extra month may be enough time to grow a secondary crop. During times of drought, what rain does fall can be collected in the pits and used to secure the farmers' main crops.

=== Bucket drip irrigation ===
An irrigation system consisting of a bucket hung from a pole, with a hose coming out of the bottom, and holes punched into the hose. The bucket is filled, and gravity feeds the water to the plants.

=== Treadle pumps ===
The treadle pump is a human-powered pump designed to lift water from a depth of seven metres or less. A treadle is lever device pressed by the foot to drive a machine, in this case a pump. The treadle pump can do most of the work of a motorized pump, but costs considerably less to purchase, and needs no fossil fuel, as it is driven by the operator's body weight and leg muscles. It can lift 5–7 metres^{3} of water per hour from wells and boreholes up to seven metres deep and can also be used to draw water from lakes and rivers. Most treadle pumps used are of local manufacture, as they are simple and inexpensive to build.

Standard treadle pumps are suction pumps, and were first developed in the early 1980s in Bangladesh. Most treadle pumps manufactured in Africa are pressure treadle pumps, a modification to the original design that means water is forced out of the pump under pressure. Pressure treadle pumps are more versatile as they allow farmers to pump water uphill, or over long distances, or fill elevated tanks.

== Pest control ==
=== Crop rotation ===
Crop rotation is the cornerstone pest control in the tropics. When a single crop is planted repeatedly in the same soil, insects and diseases that attack that crop are allowed to build up to unmanageable levels, greatly reducing the farmer's harvest.

The most basic form of crop rotation is also the simplest: never plant the same thing in the same place twice. This results in naturally breaking the cycles of weeds, insects and diseases that attack food crops. Rotations are used to prevent or at least partially control several pests and at the same time to reduce the farmer's reliance on chemical pesticides. Crop rotations often are the only economically feasible method for reducing insect and disease damage.

Crop rotation replaces a crop that is susceptible to a serious pest with another crop that is not susceptible. Each food crop comes with its own set of pests that attack that particular crop. By planting a different crop each time, the farmer is able to starve out those pests. Often a set of three or four crops are planted on a rotating basis, ensuring that by the time the first crop is replanted, the pests that attack it are substantially reduced.

Another side benefit of crop rotation is it improves the soil. Constantly growing the same crop in the same location will strip the soil of the nutrients that particular crop requires. Rotating to a different crop will reduce the pressure placed on the soil. Or if a green manure is used as part of the rotation sequence, the soil can actually be improved.

=== Integrated pest management ===
Integrated pest management (IPM) was developed as an alternative to the heavy use of chemical pesticides. Eliminating all insect pests requires the extensive use of chemical pesticides, which over time can become self-defeating. Farmers end up using more and more chemicals with diminishing effect as pests quickly adapt –while at the same time natural predator insects are eliminated from the farm. Under IPM, chemicals should be a secondary line of defense, while building up the number of natural predators on a farm is the main goal. The IPM approach calls for keeping the pest populations below the levels at which they cause economic injury, not total eradication.

IPM in its pure form is complex, and beyond the ability of most farmers to manage; however, the underlying principles have gained widespread acceptance in the tropics, with most governments sponsoring IPM educational programs.

== Pioneering crops ==
Pioneering crops are used in places where the land has been striped bare, and the topsoil has been entirely lost to erosion, or where desertification has started. The intent is not to grow food or cash crops, but to repair and reinvigorate the soil in order to prepare the way for the later planting of food or cash crops. Nitrogen fixing plants and trees normally form the basis of such a reclamation project.

== Hunger season or lean period ==
The hunger season is that period of time when all the food from the previous harvest has been consumed, and the next harvest is still some time away. Even in normal years, many households face an annual reduction in the amount of food they have available. Typically the hunger season will coincide with the start of planting the new crop, or shortly thereafter. So farmers are faced with a shortage of food at the very time they are expected to perform their heaviest labor.

One way of mitigating the effects of the hunger season is growing some non-seasonal crops close to the family home, such as bananas in humid areas, or cassava where it is arid. As an example, a family that has ten banana plants producing fruit during the hunger season is unlikely to experience excessive hardship. Maize, sweet potato, pigeon pea, and Moringa oleifera are other examples.

== Major constraints ==
=== Mild winters ===
Winters are mild in the tropics; with no frost, snow, or ice, insect populations flourish year-round. In temperate areas, winter reduces most insect pest populations prior to the emergence of new crops, so plants coming up in the spring have a chance to take hold and grow prior to being attacked. In the tropics, plants enter a world already full of adult insects.

Mild winters allow winter crops to be grown in some areas, such as India.

=== Acidic soils ===
Soils in the humid tropics are normally highly acidic and nutrient poor; decomposition is rapid because of high temperatures, high humidity, and frequent heavy rains. Heavy rains, especially monsoon rains, lead to rapid nutrient leaching, and chemical weathering of the soil. Standard temperate strategies for improving nutrient-poor soil, such as composting, have limited application in such an environment due to rapid leaching.

Aluminum is the most common metal found in the Earth's crust. It is found in all soils and in all environments, from temperate to tropical. In a soluble state, it is highly toxic to plant life, as it inhibits root growth; however, in neutral and alkaline soils common to the temperate zones, it is insoluble and therefore inert. Soil fertility is directly influenced by how acidic it is, as the more acidic, the higher the level of aluminum toxicity; in areas where the pH drops below 5, aluminum becomes soluble and can enter into plant roots where it accumulates.

Around a third of all tropical soils are too acidic to support traditional food crops. These highly acidic tropical soils represent the largest untapped arable land left in the world, so more productive use of these lands is key to expanding the world food supply.

Winrock International states, "In the humid tropics, the relative importance of acid soils is greatest in Latin America (81%), but also significant in Africa (56%) and Asia (38%)".

Traditionally on commercial farms, aluminum toxicity is countered by adding lime to the soil, which neutralizes the acid and renders the aluminum inert. However, many small land holders and resource-poor farmers cannot afford lime, and instead rely on slash-and-burn agriculture. As the original plant life is burnt, the ash acts to neutralize the acidic soil and makes the area acceptable for food plants. In time, acidity increases and only native plants will grow, forcing the farmer to move on and clear a new area.

Soil color in humid areas is related to the level of oxidation that has occurred in the soil, with red soil being the result of iron oxidation, and yellow soil being the result of aluminum oxidation.

=== Salinization ===
Salinization occurs naturally in arid areas where not enough rain falls to wash soluble salts down and out of the root zone. Salinization is a common side effect of irrigation. As water is used by plants and evaporates from the soil surface, the salt in the water concentrates in the soil. The high temperatures and low humidity in arid regions means that salinization often accompanies irrigation.

=== Day-length sensitive plants ===
Some plants have a photoperiod (phototropism) requirement for a certain number of hours of daylight before they will grow, flower, or produce fruit. Without this, they will not complete their life cycle and will not produce fruit and seeds. So, seeds brought from the temperate zones may not perform as expected, or at all in the tropics. Some plants are genetically keyed to only start producing when a certain number of hours of daylight is reached, the same number of hours as is found in their native habitat. With the shorter daylight hours experienced in the tropics, that switch never gets thrown.

== Vulnerability to climate change ==
A combination of factors make the tropics one of the world's most vulnerable regions to the negative impacts of climate change on agriculture. These include:

- High population density across much of the tropics
- High proportion of developing nations with high incidence of poverty and underdevelopment
- Large percentage of population in these countries highly dependent on agriculture for their livelihood
- Dependence on rain-fed agricultural systems, especially in the arid/semiarid tropics
- Shortening of growing seasons and increases in temperature beyond the extremes already experienced in some areas
- Projected decrease in crop yields at low latitudes in contrast to high latitudes

The fact that climate change and temperature increases are expected to negatively affect crop yields in the tropics could have troublesome implications for poverty and food security, mainly because populations in the area are so dependent on agriculture as their only means of survival. A 2008 study by the CGIAR Research Program on Climate Change, Agriculture and Food Security matched future climate change "hotspots" with regions that are already suffering from chronic poverty and food insecurity to pinpoint regions in the tropics that could be especially vulnerable to future changes in climate. These include regions such as West Africa which are already dependent on drought- and stress-resistant crop varieties and thus left with little room to manoeuvre when the climate becomes even drier. The study says that East and West Africa, India, parts of Mexico and Northeastern Brazil will experience a shortening of growing seasons by more than 5%, negatively impacting a number of important crop staples.

== Common tropical horticulture crops ==
- Banana
- Coconut
- Palms (mainly oil palm)
- Papaya
- Rubber tree

== Common agricultural crops ==
- Barley
- Beans
- Cassava
- Chickpea
- Cocoa (chocolate)
- Coffee
- Cowpea
- Maize (corn)
- Mango
- Millet
- Pineapple
- Rice
- Sorghum
- Sugarcane
- Sweet potato
- Tobacco
- Taro
- Tea
- Yam

== See also ==
- Portal:Agriculture and agronomy (portal)
