= Cusp Conference =

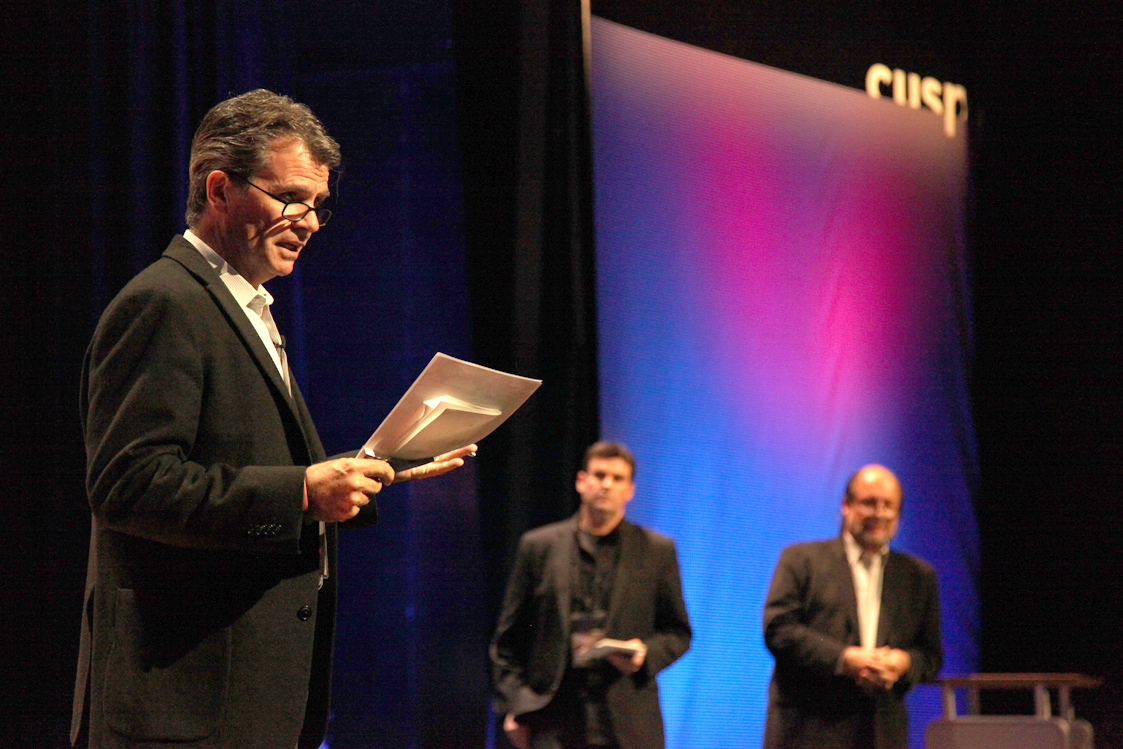
Cusp Conference

Cusp Conference was an annual conference of people from the arts, sciences, technology, business and design.

The program was intended to provoke cross-pollination of ideas and generate new thinking, in 25 or more presentations over two days.

A conference "about the design of everything" created and hosted by design firm Multiple Inc. (formerly smbolic) and held at the Museum of Contemporary Art Theater in Chicago, Cusp was centered on the idea that virtually everything that exists has been designed - by humans, by nature or by some other force.

Cusp Conference presenters have touched on topics including landscape waste, contemporary dance, electric vehicles, democracy, social media, education, intellectual property law, medicine, virtual worlds, typography, green architecture, evolutionary biology, smell and taste and serious games.

== History ==
Launched in 2008, Cusp Conference presenters and performers have included Adam Curry, Yves Behar, Andy Bichlbaum, Baba Brinkman, Molly Crabapple, Matthew Diffee, Josh Elder, Hartmut Esslinger, iJustine, Richard Farson, John Fetterman, Douglas Gayeton, Kirsty Hawkshaw, Dr. Alan Hirsch, Dr. Carl Hodges, Dr. Ayanna Howard, Michelle Kaufmann, Robert F. Kennedy Jr., Rita J. King, Camille and Kennerly Kitt, Neo-Futurists, Dr Paul Polak, Wendell Potter, Daniel Bernard Roumain, Smoking Popes, and Richard Saul Wurman.

No new conferences have been held following the 2018 conference.
