= Treadle pump =

Foot operated water pump

A treadle pump is a human-powered suction pump that sits on top of a well and is used for irrigation. It is designed to lift water from a depth of seven metres or less. The pumping is activated by stepping up and down on a treadle, which are levers, which drive pistons, creating cylinder suction that draws groundwater to the surface.

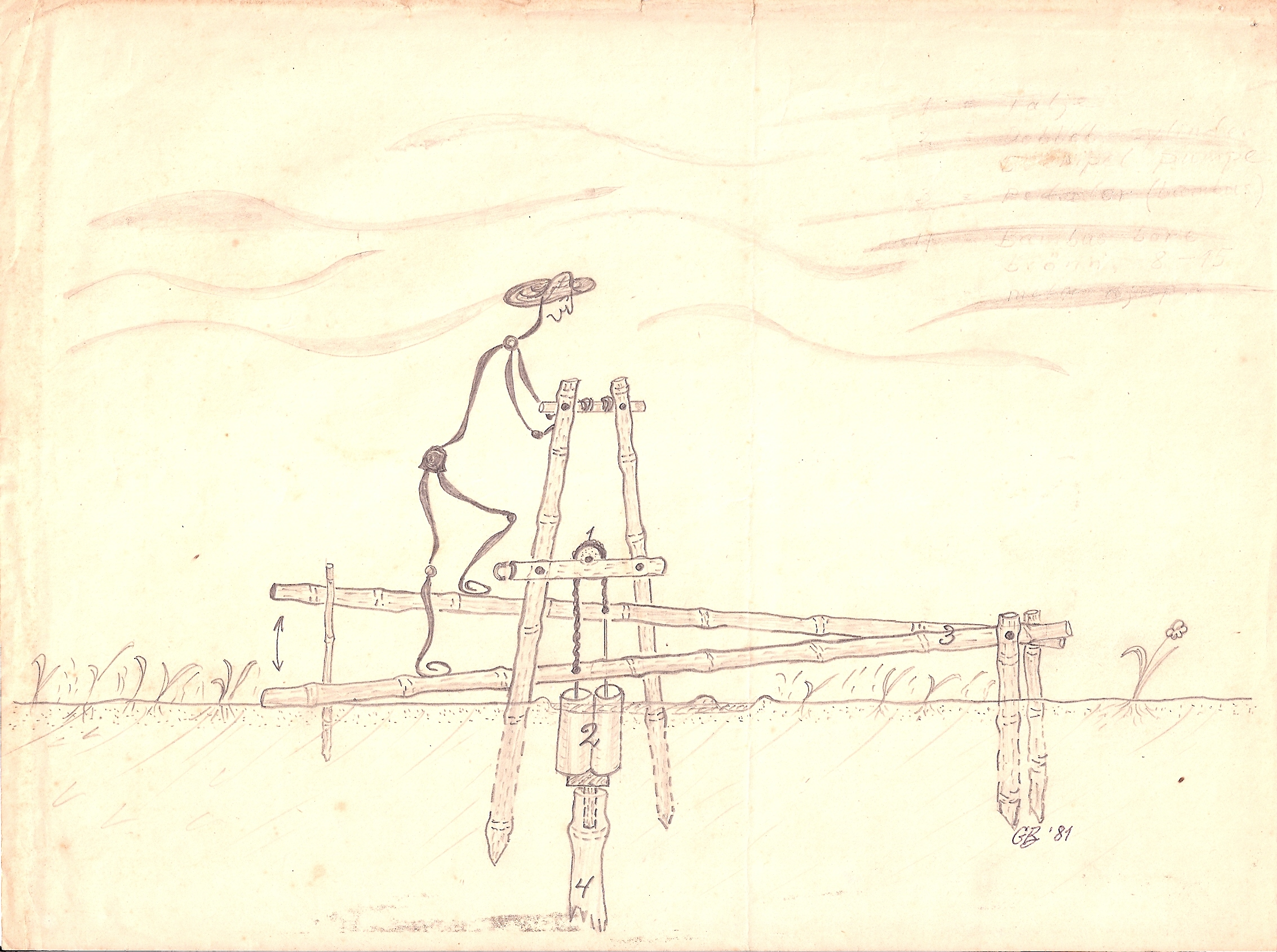
Example of a treadle pump.

== Application ==
Treadle pumps free farmers from dependence on rain-fed irrigation and helps farmers maximize return on their small plots of land. The treadle pump can do most of the work of a motorized pump, but costs considerably less. Pump prices including installation range between US$20 and $100. Because it needs no fossil fuel (it is driven by the operator's body weight and leg muscles), it can also cost less (50%) to operate than a motorized pump. It can lift five to seven cubic metres of water per hour from wells and boreholes up to seven metres deep and can also be used to draw water from lakes and rivers. Many treadle pumps are manufactured locally, but they can be challenging to produce consistently without highly skilled welders and production hardware.

Treadle pumps are most commonly used by farmers on small plots of land, typically about the size of an acre. They are also used in poor countries and small villages such as: villages in Africa, small farmers in Asia, and anywhere else where money is an issue.

Compared to bucket irrigation, the treadle pump can greatly increase the income that farmers generate from their land by increasing the number of growing seasons, by expanding the types of crops that can be cultivated, and improving on the quality of grown crops.

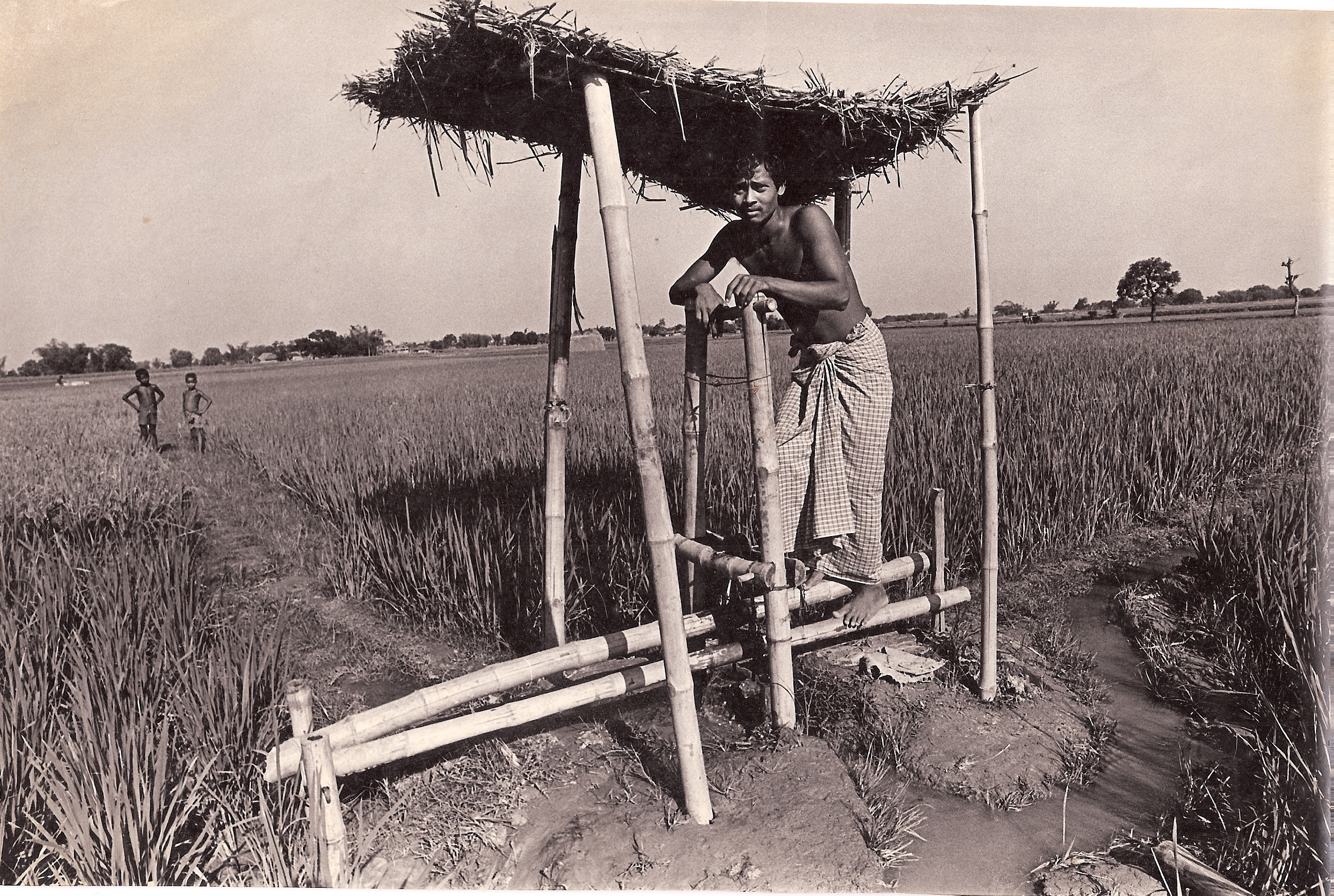
Photo of a treadle pump

== History ==
RDRS then a program of Lutheran World Federation\World Service in northern Bangladesh had begun the search for efficient, low-cost irrigation technology using local materials from 1975, experimenting with many varieties and the model developed by Norwegian intermediate technologist Gunnar Barnes was developed in 1979. Later claims that the treadle pump was invented in 1980 by Mr. Narendra Nath Deb in Bangladesh (), with input from Dan Jenkins, USAID engineer were somewhat inaccurate although both contributed to its further development and replication

Working with the poor, RDRS endeavored to produce an affordable manual pump for irrigation. The main criteria were that it should be able to irrigate at least 0.5 ha of wheat, the total cost of purchase and installation was not to be more than the price of one bag of paddy, and the pump was to be simple enough to make and repair locally. This led to the use of bamboo tubewell and frame, and other locally available materials.

Beginning in 1976, they came up with various designs of foot-operated pumps which, because they only used one leg, were not comfortable and had low output. The last design before the treadle pump was a “Y-pump”, having two cylinders welded together in a Y shape, and a hand-driven rocking frame so the hands could help the foot. The plungers were also of a special and more efficient design, which were subsequently adopted by the handpump industry in Bangladesh and India. The improvements started to gain interest for the pump. With the development of the treadle pump, using components of the Y pump but having the use of both legs, there was immediate interest and demand.

The treadle pump was introduced in December, 1980, and thereafter the RDRS workshop produced 20 pumps a day to meet demands. By 1982 there were different models of the pump: twin tubewell, twin dugwell, twin low-lift, twin tubewell with drinking spout, and household model.

In March, 1988, the cost of a treadle pump, installed, was about $20 U.S.

=== Production and marketing ===
As the small RDRS workshop in Rangpur was unable to keep up with demand, RDRS helped local entrepreneurs set up workshops to make the treadle pump (known early on as the “twin treadle pump”). The first of the workshops was the North Bengal Agriculture Workshop in Lalmonirhat (NBAW), started in 1981. The fourth workshop was that of Mr. Narendra Nath Deb. Mr. Deb was already making pumps of his own design, but contracted in 1984 for his workers to be trained in making the treadle pump. By the end of 1984, 26,701 treadle pumps had been sold. Since 1985, 84 manufacturers now produce treadle pumps and have currently sold 1.4 million treadle pumps to small plot Bangladeshi farmers.

One of the first instances of the treadle pump moving out of Bangladesh was its promotion by the International Rice Research Institute (IRRI) in the Philippines in 1984, under Robert Stickney. There it was called the “Tapak-Tapak” Pump.

In 1986, iDE identified the treadle pump as a technology which could help raise income and productivity on small farms, and entered into the field of marketing the pumps. iDE also started helping to set up workshops to make the pump, and has gone on to be one of the main players in disseminating the treadle pump technology throughout the world.

=== Further development ===
Since its inception, the treadle pump has had many modifications. One of the most useful has been the pressure pump, which enables water to be pumped above the height of the pump. A main player in its development was Carl Bielenberg, whose work (based on a 1985 design by Dan Jenkins) was supported by Appropriate Technology International, and CARE. This model has also been adapted to suit local conditions and material available. Pressure treadle pumps allow farmers to spray water and run sprinklers, eliminating the need for an elevated water storage tank and suction pump system. Pressure pumps are widely in use in East Africa though KickStart International and in Myanmar through Proximity Designs. Many Non-Governmental Organizations (NGOs) (IDE, IDE-India, iDE UK, KickStart International, Proximity Designs, Practical Action (formally ITDG)) have been active in developing treadle pumps, as have student and researcher teams at universities.
