= Carl Hodges =

American physicist (1937–2021)

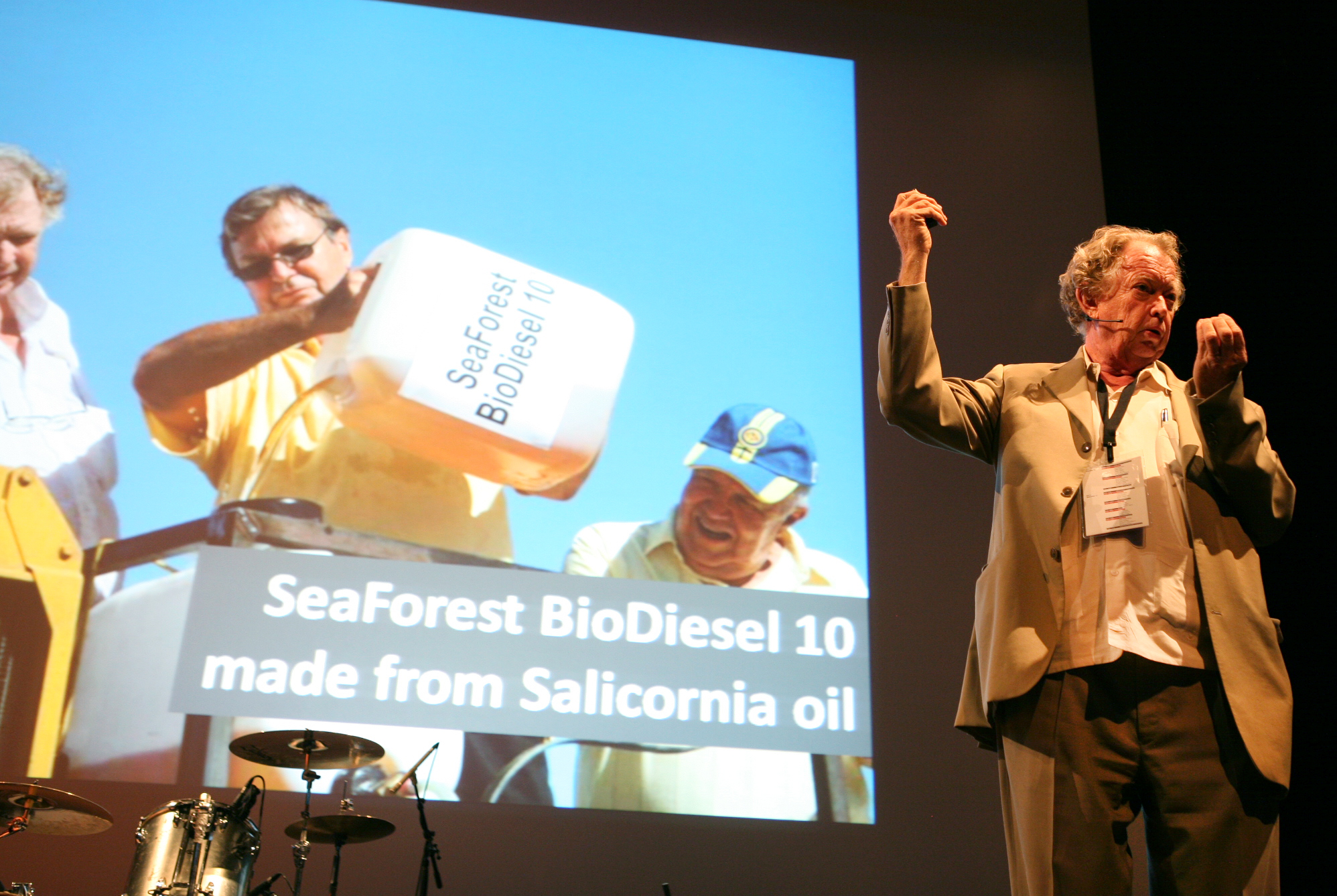
Carl Hodges presenting at Cusp Conference 2008, Chicago, Illinois

Carl N. Hodges (March 19, 1937 – April 3, 2021) was an American atmospheric physicist and founder of the Seawater foundation. He was the main driving force behind ideas of using sea canals to irrigate deserts.

The idea is to grow sea farms in the artificial sea canals using plants like salicornia and mangrove, and introducing fish and shrimp. This is thought to be able to resurrect ecosystems, create jobs, wealth and food sources. This has been proposed as a solution for starvation and even being able to counter the effects of global warming and rising sea levels.

He was a primary consultant on development of the Epcot attraction, Listen to the Land.
