= Equalize Health =

Not for profit Medical Technology Company

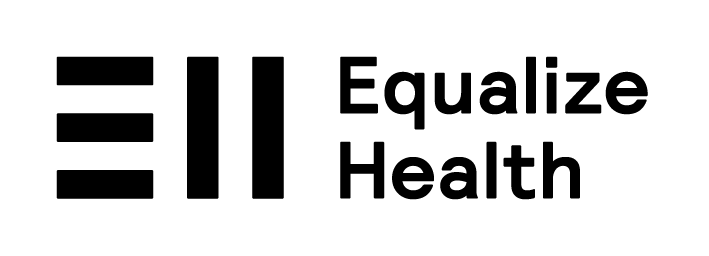
- Founded: 2007
- Founder: Paul Polak, Kurt Kulmann

Equalize Health (formerly D-Rev) is a non-profit medical technology company with offices in India, Kenya, and the United States.

Equalize Health’s products include the ReMotion Knee, a polycentric prosthetic knee for above-the-knee amputees, and Brilliance, a phototherapy device for treating neonatal jaundice.

== Business model ==
Equalize Health (formerly D-Rev) is a 501(c)(3) organization that researches, designs, and develops products and then works with in-country partners such as Phoenix Medical Systems and Puspadi Bali to deliver products.

== Impact ==
Equalize Health released its impact dashboards in June 2014. Reflecting a strong industry emphasis on measuring impact of social entrepreneurship, D-Rev designed and implemented impact measurement tools and tracking for each device.

Brilliance As of June 30, 2020, Equalize Health reports that more than 900,000 babies have been treated with Brilliance devices.

ReMotion Knee As of June 30, 2020, 777 amputees have been fit with the ReMotion Knee.

== History ==
D-Rev was founded in 2007 by Paul Polak and engineer Kurt Kulmann aiming to “benefit the 90% of the people on earth who are poor, in order to help them earn their way out of poverty”. In 2009, Krista Donaldson joined D-Rev as CEO.

Donaldson spoke at TEDWomen 2014, TEDx Stanford 2012, and the Clinton Global Initiative. Prior to D-Rev, Donaldson interned at the design firm IDEO, worked as a staff engineer for KickStart International on micro-irrigation pumps, and served as an Iraq Economic Officer for the U.S. Department of State. Donaldson has been or currently serves as a lecturer at the University of Cape Town, Kenyatta University, and Stanford University. In November 2020, D-Rev changed its name to Equalize Health.
