= International Development Enterprises =

US-based nonprofit organization

iDE
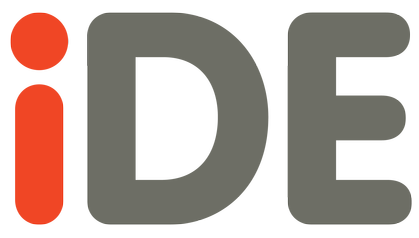
- Founded: 1982
- Founder: Paul Polak
- Type: Non-governmental organization
- Location: Denver, Colorado, United States
- CEO: Tim Prewitt
- Website: www.ideglobal.org

iDE, formerly International Development Enterprises, is an international nonprofit organization that promotes a business approach to increasing income and creating livelihood opportunities for poor rural households. iDE was founded in 1982 by Paul Polak, a Denver, Colorado psychiatrist who promoted the concept of helping poor people become entrepreneurs instead of simply giving them handouts. Originally, iDE was devoted to the manufacture, marketing, and distribution of affordable, scalable micro-irrigation and low-cost water recovery systems throughout the developing world. iDE facilitates local manufacture and distribution of these products through local supply chains that sell to farmers at an affordable price which they can repay in one growing season. This strategy allows farmers to grow higher value and surplus crops, and in turn links them to high-value crop markets where they can realize profits from their higher yields. Recently, their success is in the promotion of sanitation products (simple latrines, ceramic water filters) to decrease the practice of open defecation leading to diarrheal disease.

iDE has funding affiliates in the United Kingdom and Canada. The head office is located in Denver, United States.

== Overview ==
iDE distinguishes its approach from traditional charity models, describing its approach as creating an enabling environment for poor rural households to participate effectively in rural market systems so they may increase their income and begin an upward spiral out of poverty. The organization promotes specific innovations in products, services, or business models as solutions to development problems. Three-quarters of people living in extreme poverty earn their living from small farms, and experience has shown that this market-based approach can help poor rural farmers increase their agricultural productivity, improving incomes, food security, and nutritional outcomes. In water, sanitation, and hygiene (WASH), iDE helps develop local businesses that supply latrines and water filters to low-income households in a manner that allows for the generation of profit along the supply chain while maintaining a price appropriate for poor households. iDE measures its success as average income gain per household (impact), number of farmers reached (scale) and total additional income generated per dollar (cost effectiveness). For every $1 invested in its projects, iDE customers generate on average $10.50 in additional household income in agriculture and $16.30 in increased savings in WASH.

iDE currently operates country programs in Nepal, Bangladesh, Cambodia, Vietnam, Zambia, Ethiopia, Ghana, Mozambique, Burkina Faso, Nicaragua and Honduras. The organization employs nearly 1,000 total staff worldwide and had budget of $25 million in 2015. With funding from more than 110 donors, including USAID, the Bill and Melinda Gates Foundation, SDC, Dutch Ministry of Foreign Affairs, CIDA, DFID, and the World Bank, iDE has implemented more than 275 projects worldwide.

=== Agriculture development ===
iDE invests in the design and initial promotion of affordable irrigation equipment, such as pumps, drip systems, and water storage, and engages the private sector to sustain the necessary supply chains. iDE also implements integrated value chain development approaches that focus on supporting existing enterprises to supply and market appropriate farm inputs, provides technical and business advice for small producers, and improves smallholder farmers' market access. iDE developed an innovative business model to provide high-quality agricultural inputs and technical advice to poor farmers through commission-based sales agents known as Farm Business Advisors (FBA). iDE provides support to FBAs through training, bulk purchasing power, credit access, market information, and promotion while ensuring standards for product and service quality are maintained. FBAs then analyze individual farms to identify opportunities and match them with the appropriate inputs. FBAs sell the inputs at a profit and provide technical advice during visits throughout the growing season.

=== Water, sanitation, and hygiene (WASH) ===
iDE also pioneered market-based approaches in the WASH sector that incorporate private-sector, NGOs, and government stakeholders. Developing markets for sanitation improves rural sanitation at scale by connecting consumers with products and services that they want and can afford. This approach avoids the use of direct subsidies for hardware or installation, instead creating demand for sanitation products and services by promoting them through innovative means that align with the goals and aspirations of the target market. Sanitation marketing also develops sustainable businesses to supply those products and services to low-income households in a manner that allows for the generation of profit along the supply chain while maintaining a price point appropriate for poor households.

== Technology ==
=== Treadle pumps ===
The treadle pump is a foot-powered water pump developed in the 1970s by Norwegian engineer Gunnar Barnes. In the 1980s, iDE initiated a campaign to market the pumps to smallholder farmers. Over the course of 12 years, 1.5 million treadle pumps were purchased, increasing the purchasers' incomes by $150 million annually. The cost of the treadle pump program was $12 million, compared with conventional dam and canal systems which would have cost $1.5 billion to irrigate a similar area. The treadle pump program in India won an Ashden Award in 2006.

=== Drip irrigation ===
Although drip irrigation is not a new technology, iDE has made major strides in breaking down the costs of irrigation systems to make them affordable and more usable (i.e., by encouraging manufacturers to sell kits sized for one acre farms) to low-income farmers. Micro-irrigation has enormous potential, as it uses 30–60% less water than traditional methods, reduces salinization, delivers water directly to the roots of crops, and increases yields by 5–50%.

=== Ceramic filters ===
iDE has also promoted the use of ceramic water filters in countries such as Cambodia. Ceramic water filters can significantly improve household water quality (up to 99.99% reduction in E. coli) and can be manufactured locally and sold for under US$10.

== Country programs ==
iDE has country programs in 3 continents and 11 countries:

Asia

- Bangladesh
- Cambodia
- Vietnam
- Nepal

Africa

- Burkina Faso
- Ghana
- Ethiopia
- Mozambique
- Zambia

Latin America

- Honduras
- Nicaragua

== Impact and awards ==
As of late 2016, iDE estimates that it has improved incomes for more than 26 million people and catalyzed the commercial distribution of some 2.5 million irrigation technologies, which, on average, produce $150 of additional income annually. Over the last five years, iDE has facilitated the sale of 222,000 WASH technologies, benefiting over 1 million people, improving health and saving money previously spent on treatment. The income or savings from these interventions allows families to invest in nutrition, healthcare, education and additional business activities.

iDE has received a number of awards, including being named #33 in the NGO Advisor Top 500 World NGOs. (In previous years, iDE was #36 (2015), #36 (2014), #30 (2013), and #75 (2012).) Guidestar listed iDE as one of the top 16 nonprofits working in the water, sanitation, and hygiene sector. iDE received the 2012 Dubai International Award for Best Practices (DIABP) for its sanitation marketing approach and the AGFUND International Prize for Pioneering Human Development Projects in 2009 for its PRISM approach. iDE Cambodia was the first recipient of the 2010 Nestle Prize in Creating Shared Value for its Farm Business Advisors program. The InterAmerican Institute for Cooperation on Agriculture (IICA) through its Agricultural Innovation Network Project (Red SICTA) selected iDE for the best adaptive technology regarding climate change.

Charity Navigator currently gives iDE a rating of 94/100.

== See also ==
- Market Systems Resilience Index
