= Sabre saw =

Hand-held powered reciprocating saw

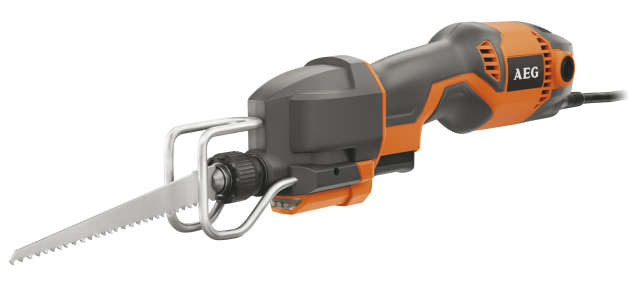
AEG us 400 xe

The sabre saw (also saber saw) is a hand-held powered reciprocating saw, like a jigsaw.

The sabre saw uses a toothed blade, chiefly to cut through wood and other soft materials.
