= Jigsaw (tool) =

Type of saw

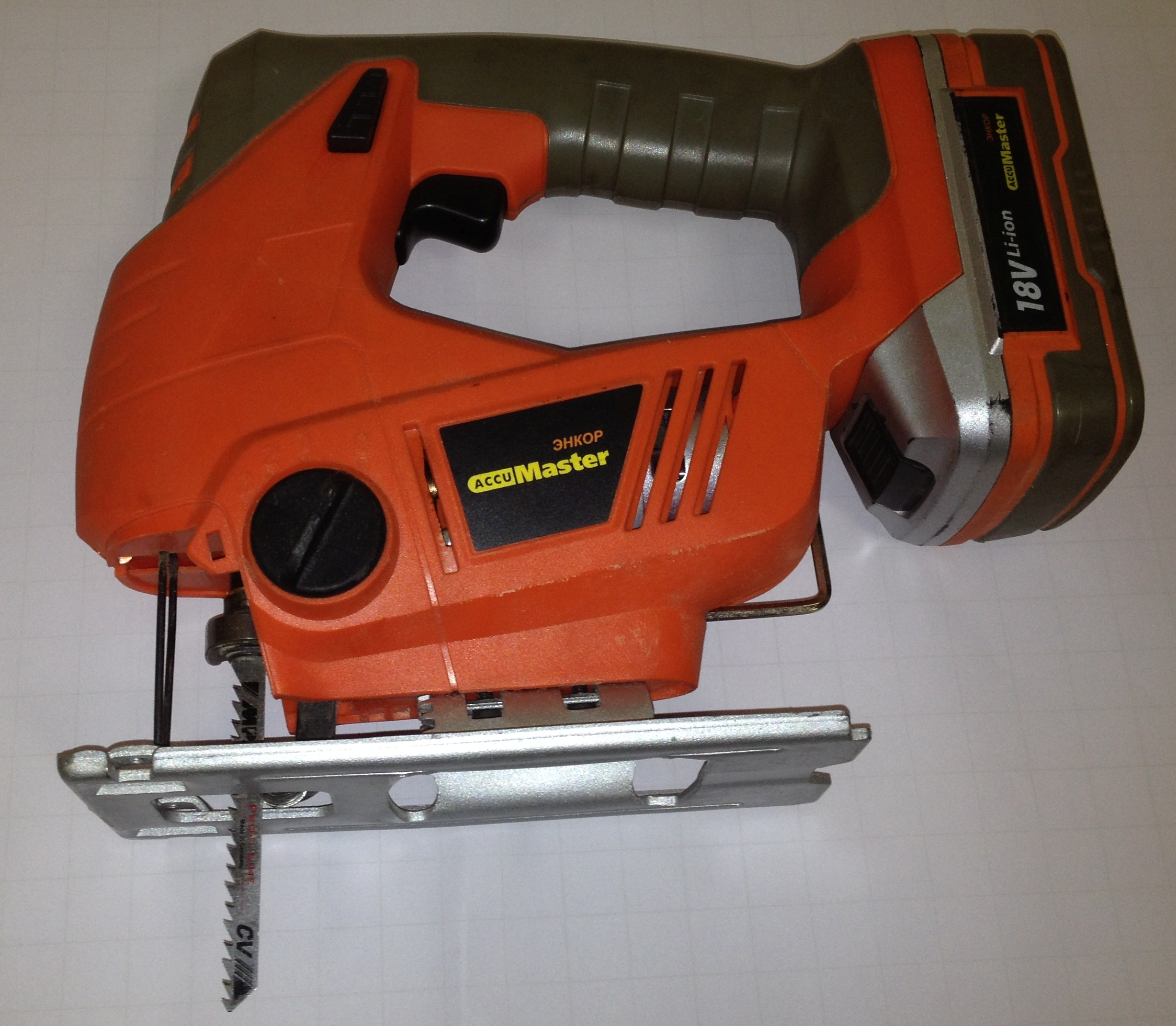

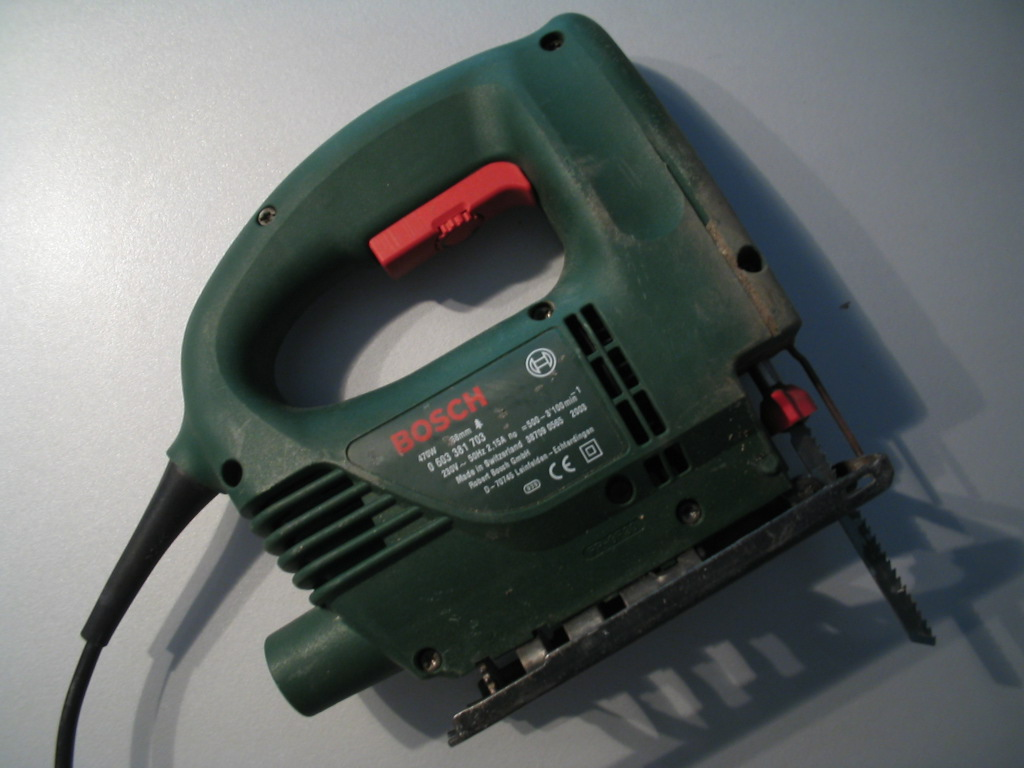
A power jigsaw

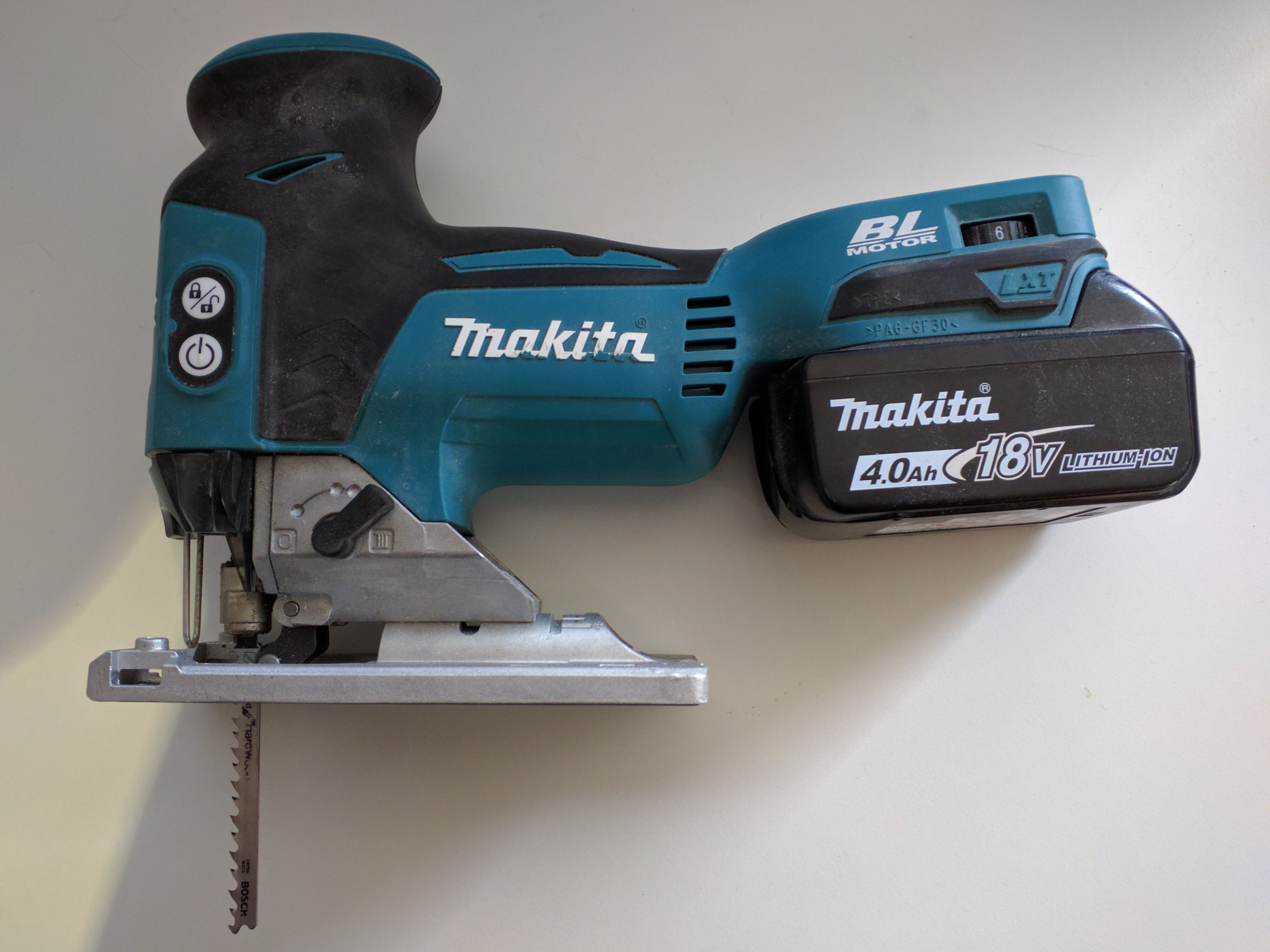
Battery-powered jigsaw

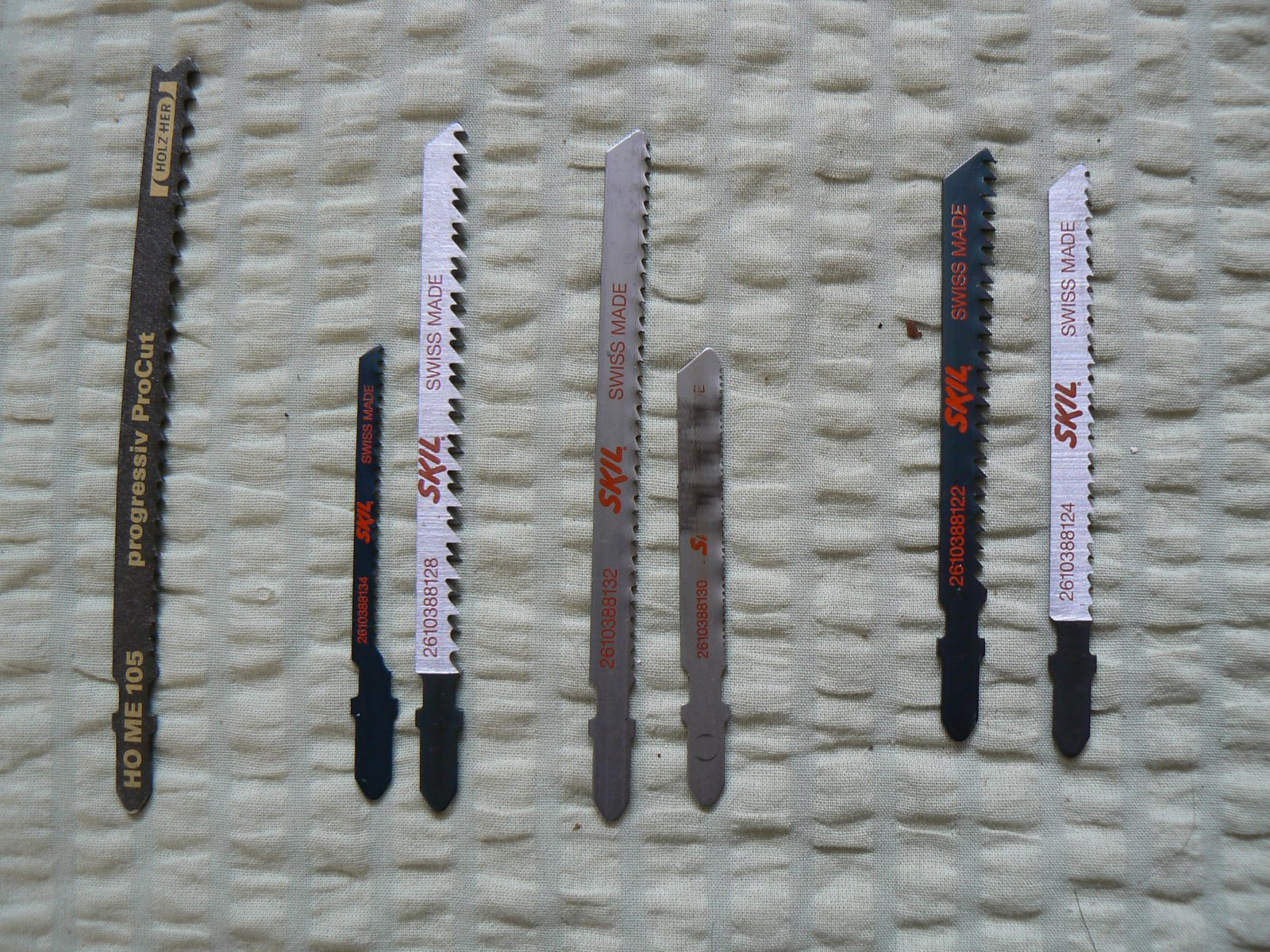
T-shank blades

A jigsaw is a reciprocating saw that can cut irregular curves, such as stenciled designs, in wood, metal, or other materials.

Jigsaws first emerged in the 19th century and employed a treadle to operate the blade, which was thin and under tension, being secured at both ends to an oscillating frame. This kind of saw is now usually called a scroll saw.

The modern portable jigsaw, with a rigid blade secured at one end and cutting on the up-stroke, was introduced in 1947 by Scintilla AG (later acquired by Bosch).

A jigsaw power tool is made up of an electric motor and a reciprocating saw blade. Jigsaws with sole plates that have a beveling function can cut angles typically up to 45 degrees relative to the normal vertical stroke to make miter joints. Portable jigsaws have historically been mains-powered, but are increasingly being displaced by battery-powered models.

The tool's ability to carve out irregular shapes lends its name to the jigsaw puzzle, where each tile is shaped to connect to its neighbors.

== History ==
In 1946 Albert Kaufmann, an engineer of Scintilla AG company in Solothurn, Switzerland, replaced the needle on his wife's sewing machine with a saw blade. In 1947, after development of Kaufmann's invention, Scintilla started producing jigsaws under name "Lesto jigsaw". In 1954 Scintilla was acquired by Bosch. An important innovation by Scintilla-Bosch in 1966 was the "pendulum action", where the blade tilts forward in the upward (cutting) stroke, and back for the down-stroke, ejecting the chips, so the blade runs cooler and cuts faster. A significant model was the Bosch "LESTO 8 554" in which the degree of "pendulum action" could be selected to suit the material being cut. Such a mechanism introduces additional purchase and maintenance costs, and manufacture of such models may have ceased in recent years. Many modern jigsaws have an adjustment for tilting the blade tip forward, but at a static, fixed angle, claiming similar benefits.

== Blades ==
A jigsaw works by attaching a blade accessory to the tool. There are various types of blades in the market. Older jigsaws require a blade to be screwed into the tool. But since Bosch introduced the first tool-free blade change system, most manufacturers now offer a similar setup allowing a quick & tool-free blade change.

There are T-shank blades and U-shank blades available in the accessory market. T-Shank blades are the industry-standard professional interface that provides a longer life and a tighter fit from the blade to the tool.

Tooth design is important for the performance of a blade. The tooth spacing, tooth shape, and cutting angle are important in providing speed, cleanliness of cuts, and optimal performance. A side set and ground tooth is designed for clean and fast cuts in wood and plastics. Wavy set and milled teeth will cut most metals as well as plastics. A side set and milled tooth works with fast and rougher cuts in wood and plastics. A ground and taper-ground tooth is for precise, fine and clean cuts in wood. There are also blades with reduced-kerf carbide and diamond grit edges for fast cutting in hard materials.

== Blade material ==
Different blade materials are used for different applications to improve blade life and cutting performance.

High-carbon steel (HCS) is used for softer materials such as wood, laminated particle board, and plastics due to its flexibility.

High-speed steel (HSS) withstands higher temperatures and can cut many types of metals.

Bi-Metal (BIM) blades contain a combination of high-carbon steel and high-speed steel. The combination creates a strong and flexible material that can be used for demanding applications where there is a risk of breakage or when extreme flexibility and versatility is required. Bi-Metal blades have longer lifespans and prolonged job performance compared to other types of blades.

Tungsten carbide (TC) blades have the strength to cut through abrasive materials such as reinforced plastics, fiberglass, cement board, stainless steel, tile, glass, cast iron, and brick.

Diamond-grit blades are extremely versatile, as they can cut rough materials such as hard porcelain tile, granite, slate, marble, and other stones due to their finely milled particles. This makes their uses similar to carbide blades, although diamond-grit blades typically last longer.

== Controllability ==
Control is an issue with jigsaws; the blades are small and weak, with the lower end entirely unsupported. Good cut control requires the presence of blade rollers, which keep the blade aligned just above the sole plate. In addition, heavy-cast sole plate saws are somewhat better than pressed steel for sawing line control. To guide a jigsaw on curved cut, it must be steered (turned) and not forced to move sideways. The use of sharp blades is important as well to get high quality cuts.

== See also ==
- Sabre saw, an older name for the jig saw but sometimes a synonym for reciprocating saw.
- Reciprocating saw, used in demolition and construction, heavier and easier to use on vertical surfaces.
