= Imagination Age =

Proposed era of humanity after the Information Age

The Imagination Age is a theorized period following the Information Age where creativity and imagination become the primary engines of economic value (in contrast, the main activities of the Information Age were analysis and rational thought). It has been proposed that new technologies like virtual reality and user-created content will change the way humans interact with each other and create economic and social structures.

The AI boom of the 2020s increased the ubiquity of information. The relevant neologism for the period is the Fourth Industrial Revolution, popularized in 2016 based on transformative developments shifting the nature of industrial capitalism.

In theory, the value of "imagination work" done by designers, artists, et cetera, will rise above rational thinking as a foundation of culture and economics. One conception is the advent of an immersive virtual reality (the metaverse or the cyberspace).

== Origins of the term ==
The terms Imagination Age as well as Age of Imagination were first introduced in an essay by designer and writer Charlie Magee in 1993. His essay, "The Age of Imagination: Coming Soon to a Civilization Near You" proposes the idea that the best way to assess the evolution of human civilization is through the lens of communication.

The most successful groups throughout human history have had one thing in common: when compared to their competition they had the best system of communication. The fittest communicators—whether tribe, citystate, kingdom, corporation, or nation—had (1) a larger percentage of people with (2) access to (3) higher quality information, (4) a greater ability to transform that information into knowledge and action, (5) and more freedom to communicate that new knowledge to the other members of their group.

Imagination Age, as a philosophical tenet heralding a new wave of cultural and economic innovation, appears to have been first introduced by artist, writer and cultural critic Rita J. King in November 2007 essay for the British Council entitled, "The Emergence of a New Global Culture in the Imagination Age", where she began using the phrase, "Toward a New Global Culture and Economy in the Imagination Age":

Rather than exist as an unwitting victim of circumstance, all too often unaware of the impact of having been born in a certain place at a certain time, to parents firmly nestled within particular values and socioeconomic brackets, millions of people are creating new virtual identities and meaningful relationships with others who would have remained strangers, each isolated within their respective realities.

King further refined the development of her thinking in a 2008 Paris essay entitled, "Our Vision for Sustainable Culture in the Imagination Age" in which she states,

Active participants in the Imagination Age are becoming cultural ambassadors by introducing virtual strangers to unfamiliar customs, costumes, traditions, rituals and beliefs, which humanizes foreign cultures, contributes to a sense of belonging to one's own culture and fosters an interdependent perspective on sharing the riches of all systems. Cultural transformation is a constant process, and the challenges of modernization can threaten identity, which leads to unrest and eventually, if left unchecked, to violent conflict. Under such conditions it is tempting to impose homogeneity, which undermines the highly specific systems that encompass the myriad luminosity of the human experience.

King has expanded her interpretation of the Imagination Age concept through speeches at the O'Reilly Media, TED, Cusp, and Business Innovation Factory conferences.

The term Imagination Age was subsequently popularized in techno-cultural discourse by other writers, futurists and technologists, who attributed the term to King, including Jason Silva.

Earlier, one-time, references to the Imagination Age can be found attributed to Carl W. Olson in his 2001 book "The Boss is Dead...: Leadership Breakthroughs for the Imagination Age, and virtual worlds developer Howard Stearns in 2005.

== Previous ages ==
The ideas of the Imagination Age depend in large part upon an idea of progress through history because of technology, notably outlined by Karl Marx.

That cultural progress has been categorized into a number of major stages of development. According to this idea civilization has progressed through the following ages, or epochs:

- Agricultural Age – economy dominated by physical work with wooden tools and animals in order to produce food
- Industrial Age – economy dominated by factories to produce commodities
- Information Age – economy dominated by knowledge workers using computers and other electronic devices for the purposes of research, finance, consulting, information technology, and other services

Following this is a new paradigm created by virtual technology, high speed internet, massive data storage, and other technologies. This new paradigm, the argument goes, will create a new kind of global culture and economy called the Imagination Age. The next and current age might have started recently:

- The term Fourth Industrial Revolution came into popular discourse in 2016

== Economic rise of imagination ==
The Imagination Age includes a society and culture dominated by the imagination economy. The idea relies on a key Marxist concept that culture is a superstructure fully conditioned by the economic substructure. According to Marxist thinking certain kinds of culture and art were made possible by the adoption of farming technology. Then with the rise of industry new forms of political organization (democracy, militarism, fascism, communism) were made possible along with new forms of culture (mass media, news papers, films). These resulted in people changing. In the case of industrialization people were trained to become more literate, to follow time routines, to live in urban communities.

The concept of the Imagination Age extends this to a new order emerging presently.

An imagination economy is defined by some thinkers as an economy where intuitive and creative thinking create economic value, after logical and rational thinking has been outsourced to other economies.

Michael Cox Chief Economist at Federal Reserve Bank of Dallas argues that economic trends show a shift away from information sector employment and job growth towards creative jobs. Jobs in publishing, he has pointed out are declining while jobs for designers, architects, actors & directors, software engineers and photographers are all growing. This shift in job creation is a sign of the beginning of the Imagination Age. The 21st century has seen a growth in games and interactive media jobs.

Cox argues that the skills can be viewed as a "hierarchy of human talents", with raw physical effort as the lowest form of value creation, above this skilled labor and information entry to creative reasoning and emotional intelligence. Each layer provides more value creation than the skills below it, and the outcome of globalization and automation is that labor is made available for higher level skills that create more value. Presently these skills tend to be around imagination, social and emotional intelligence.

== Technology ==
The concept that imagination is a commodity rests on the premise that virtual reality technology, such as Oculus Rift and HoloLens, will replace the current text-and-graphic based internet. In this 3D internet, creativity and imagination would be utilized to create user experience and value rather than information and search.

The concept is not limited to just virtual reality. Charlie Magee states that the technology that will develop during the Imagination Age would include:

The best bet is on a hybrid breakthrough created by the meshing of nanotechnology, computer science (including artificial intelligence), biotechnology (including biochemistry, biopsychology, etc.), and virtual reality.

In The Singularity is Near (2005), Raymond Kurzweil states that future combination of AI, nano-technology, and biotechnology will create a world where anything that can be imagined will be possible, raising the importance of imagination as the key mode of human thinking.

== Global implications ==
Rita J. King has been the single major advocate of the Imagination Age concept and its implications on cultural relations, identity and the transformation of the global economy and culture. King has expounded on the concept through speeches at the O'Reilly Media and TED conferences and has argued that virtual world technology and changes in people's ability to imagine other lives could promote world understanding and reduce cultural conflict. Some public policy experts have argued the emergence of the Imagination Age out of the Information Age will have a major impact on overall public policy. All are concepts discussed in The Purpose Economy by Aaron Hurst, and in the creation of The Purpose Revolution discussed in the Golden Age Companion Textbook.

== See also ==
- Attention economy
- Cognitive-cultural economy
- Cognitive Surplus, 2010 book
- Content creator
- Golden Age
- Information society
- Indigo Era
- Netocracy, concept whereby power revolves around the ability to form and use networks and technological tools
- Post-scarcity economy
- Post-work society
- Post-truth
