= Ida Benedetto (designer) =

Artist and business owner in New York

Ida Benedetto is an experience director and a researcher of immersive experience design based out of New York City. She is a co-founder of Sextantworks and Antidote Games.

== Education ==
Ida Benedetto graduated with a bachelor's degree in History at The New School University. She received a B.F.A. in Design & Technology at the Parsons School of Design, and her M.A. in Design Research at the School of Visual Arts in 2016.

== Career ==
Benedetto worked as the first Director of Dialogue Design and Community Engagement at the Rockefeller Foundation. She is a co-founder of the Antidote Game and Accused, projects which use games to explore group dynamics and systems. These projects were funded by the New York University Stern School of Business and created in partnership with the Innocence Project while using the programming tool Twine. Ida Benedetto and N. D. Austin co-founded Wanderlust Projects, which creates transgressive placemaking experiences. These projects focus on "reanimating a space or getting it back into circulation". Some of Wanderlust Projects include the Night Heron Water Town Speakeasy, the Illicit Couple's Retreat, and the Candyland Trespass Safari. These locations have now closed.

== Talks and teaching ==
Benedetto advises documentary and education organizations such as the School for Poetic Computation, Radiotopia's The Heart, and the Magnum Foundation's Photography Expanded initiative. She has given talks at Harvard's Graduate School of Design, the Tribeca Film Festival, the Cusp Conference, and Businessweek's Design Conference.

== Influence ==
Benedetto has been attributed as an influence in the work of Priya B. Parker in "The Art of Gathering: How We Meet and Why it Matters" and Bruce Feiler's "Life is in the Transitions: Mastering Change at Any Age".
