= Paul Polak =

American psychiatrist

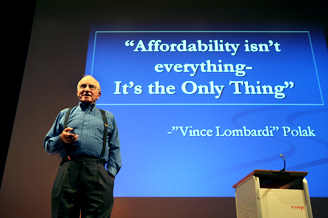
- Paul Polak presenting at Cusp Conference 2008, Chicago, IL
- Born: September 3, 1933; Prachatice, Czechoslovakia
- Died: October 10, 2019 (aged 86); Golden, Colorado, U.S.
- Education: University of Western Ontario; McGill University; University of Colorado
- Occupations: Psychiatrist; Entrepreneur
- Years active: 1957–1980; 1981–2019

Paul Polak (September 3, 1933 – October 10, 2019) was the co-founder and CEO of Windhorse International, a for-profit social venture with the mission of inspiring and leading a revolution in how companies design, price, market and distribute products to benefit the 2.6 billion customers who live on less than $2 a day.

Prior to founding Windhorse, in 2008 Polak founded D-Rev, a non-profit that seeks “to create a design revolution by enlisting the best designers in the world to develop products and ideas that will benefit the 90% of the people on earth who are poor, in order to help them earn their way out of poverty”. Polak is best known for his work with Colorado-based International Development Enterprises (iDE), a non-profit he founded in 1982 which is dedicated to developing practical solutions that harness the power of markets and attack poverty at its roots. IDE claims to have ended poverty for 45 million of the world’s poorest people by making radically affordable technology available to farmers, concrete makers, and other local small-scale entrepreneurs, and opening private sector access to markets for their products.

== Early life and education ==
Polak was born in Czechoslovakia. His family fled the country in 1939 when Paul was only six-years-old to escape the Nazis in World War II, arriving in Hamilton, Canada as refugees. When he was twelve years old, Polak learned that he could make five cents a quart picking strawberries. This sparked his entrepreneurial spirit and he, along with two partners, Morley Leatherdale and Ed Cummins, started a strawberry farm that earned him $700 for two summers’ work.

After earning his M.D. degree at the University of Western Ontario in London, Ontario, Canada in 1958, Polak completed an internship at Montreal General Hospital of McGill University during the year 1958-1959. In 1959, he moved to Denver, Colorado, to do his residency at the University of Colorado Medical Center. Polak received his certification from the American Board of Psychiatry and Neurology, in 1968.

== Career ==
=== Psychiatry ===
Polak had a wide and varying career in medicine, which included a stint as a deputy coroner and as a medical officer in Melrose, Scotland.

But his biggest contributions were in the field of psychiatry, which he practiced for 23 years in Colorado. In the late 1960's, Polak headed the Research Department at the Fort Logan Mental Health Center in Denver Colorado. It was while he was working at Fort Logan, that Polak developed a new treatment model he called Social Systems Intervention.

The model was based on studies he had done at the Research Department. He wanted to compare the way psychiatrists, patients and their families looked at the problems they were dealing with. To do this, he surveyed patients at Fort Logan, their families and the psychiatrists who were treating them.

He found that patients and their families described the issue in the same way, typically ascribing the problem to interpersonal conflicts between members of the family. Not surprisingly, the psychiatrists said the problem was caused by things like unconscious inner conflicts from childhood.

To fully investigate how the psychiatrists thought about their patients, he asked the psychiatrists to predict what the patients and their families would say the problem was. It was assumed that, even though psychiatrists might have had a more sophisticated view of the issue, they certainly would have been able to predict what the patient and family would say about the problem. To his surprise, psychiatrists couldn't do it. No matter how hard they tried, they couldn't predict what their own patients would say. This could mean only one thing: psychiatrists weren't actually listening to their patients and were instead basing their treatments on preconceived notions of the problem.

Polak wondered what would happen if psychiatrists actually listened to their patients and treated the problems they were describing. To figure that out, he founded the Crisis Intervention Unit at Fort Logan. The Crisis unit treatment regime was structured to insure that the therapist were always paying attention to what the patient and their families said. The therapists were required to document the patient and family's description of the problem. They were encouraged to bring the families into the therapy sessions and even work with extended families when it appeared that other relatives were playing a role in the situation.

What Polak discovered was that psychiatric problems were often caused by internal stresses in a family situation, and that focusing on those problems and treating the whole family resulted in quick and lasting changes. In addition, Polak observed that the worst thing you could do was admit someone to a hospital. When you did that, the hospital provided a buffer between the patient and family, and once that buffer was in place it was very difficult to remove. The patient and family would become dependent on that buffer to protect themselves from interpersonal conflict and upset emotions. The longer a patient was hospitalized, the more institutionalized they would become and the more difficult the treatment. On the other hand, helping people confront family conflict and deal with the associated emotion, lead to lasting changes that eluded other therapy techniques.

With these insights in mind, Polak went on to found the Southwest Denver Community Mental Health Center in 1971. At the center, he shifted treatment away from hospitals and into the community. The clinic was deliberately structured so it had minimal space for offices and therapy rooms, to push programs out of the clinic and into the community and homes of their clients.

Even in situations where the patient needed more intensive care for medical or psychiatric reasons, he created what he called "In Patient Alternatives." The clinic would rent rooms in private homes to serve as an alternative to in-patient care. The clinic chose homes with nurturing, supportive families, who had the strengths to handle people dealing with various crises. At the same time, there were no structured activities or programs in the homes to prevent the patients from becoming too attached or dependent on the alternative.

Over time, the clinic's programs expanded into all sorts of aspects of the community. For example, they started a community-corrections program where they worked with inmates to help them make the transition between prison and the community. Polak's ideas have spread around the world and his techniques are widely used, especially in Britain, where it is one of the models used by the UK's National Health Service. It also widely used in Australia.

All told, he has published more than seventy articles on psychiatric research, psychiatry, and community mental health.

=== Social entrepreneurship ===
After a trip to Bangladesh, Polak was inspired to use the skills he had honed while working with homeless veterans and mentally ill patients in Denver to help serve the 800 million people living on a dollar a day around the world. Employing the same tactics he pioneered as a psychiatrist, Polak spent time “walking with farmers through their one-acre farms and enjoying a cup of tea with their families, sitting on a stool in front of their thatched-roof mud–and–wattle homes”.

==== iDE ====
Based on extended conversations with more than 3,000 small-acreage farmers in developing countries, Polak devised the simple operating principles that formed the foundation for iDE, which he founded in 1982. iDE has helped more than 45 million people who survive on less than a dollar a day to move out of poverty.

==== D-Rev ====
In 2007, Polak stepped down as CEO of iDE and co-founded D-Rev with Silicon Valley technologist Kurt Kuhlmann “to create a design revolution by enlisting the best designers in the world to develop products and ideas that will benefit the 90% of the people on earth who are poor, in order to help them earn their way out of poverty”. D-Rev is a non-profit product development company that designs and delivers market-driven products to improve the health and incomes of people living on less than $4 per day. D-Rev's headquarters are in San Francisco, California.

==== Windhorse International ====
In 2007 Polak founded Windhorse International; a private company based on his ideas that business could benefit the bottom billions. The first division of Windhorse International, Spring Health Water (India) Ltd., sells affordable safe drinking water to rural Indians through local kiosk owners using a simple electro-chlorination technology. Spring Health aims, within ten years, to reach at least 100 million customers who live on less than $2 a day. Spring Health has received investment from First Light Ventures.

==== Other ====
Paul was a mentor of The Girl Effect Accelerator, a two-week business accelerator program that aims to scale startups in emerging markets that are best positioned to impact millions of girls in poverty. Paul was also a writer for Unreasonable Group’s UNREASONABLE.is platform, a blog for social entrepreneurs. His writings include business at the bottom of the pyramid, operations of social enterprise, poverty and international development. Likewise, he served as a 2014 mentor for the Unreasonable Institute.

Three principles guide Paul Polak Advisors, Windhorse International and the breadth of Polak's work:

- To have a sustainable impact on global poverty, businesses should treat poor people as customers and producers rather than as recipients of charity;
- Businesses can generate positive returns for investors by serving consumers in base-of-the-pyramid populations with average household income in the range of $1–$2 per day; and,
- By changing how they design, price, market, and distribute their products, businesses can make a transformative contribution to ending extreme poverty while making profits for their investors.

== Awards, honors, and accomplishments ==
- 2008 Polak received an Honorary Doctorate of Science from the University of Western Ontario
- 2008 Polak received Il Monito del Giardino for contributing to the preservation and safeguarding of an environment
- 2008 IDE received a $27 million grant from the Bill & Melinda Gates Foundation
- 2006 IDE received a $14 million grant from the Bill & Melinda Gates Foundation
- 2004 IDE received The Tech Museum Award for Technology Benefiting Humanity, Accenture Economic Development Award
- 2004 Polak was named the Ernst & Young Entrepreneur of the Year for the Western States
- 2003 Polak was named to the Scientific American Top 50 as an Agriculture Policy Leader

Polak wrote more than a hundred papers and articles on water, agriculture, design, and development, as well as in the field of mental health. He was the subject of articles in print media such as National Geographic, Scientific American, Forbes, Harpers, The New York Times, and The Wall Street Journal.

== Out of Poverty: What Works When Traditional Methods Fail ==
Published in 2008, Out of Poverty was Polak’s first book. In writing the book, he was responding to the following sentiment—“I hate books about poverty that make you feel guilty, as well as dry, academic ones that put you to sleep. Working to alleviate poverty is a lively, exciting field capable of generating new hope and inspiration, not feelings of gloom and doom. Learning the truth about poverty generates disruptive innovations capable of enriching the lives of rich people even more than those of poor people.”

== The Business Solution to Poverty: Designing Products and Services for Three Billion New Customers ==
A second book written by Paul Polak and Mal Warwick that was published on September 9, 2013. The key to this book is what Paul Polak and Mal Warwick call Zero-Based Design: starting from scratch to create innovative products and services tailored for the very poor, armed with a thorough understanding of what they really want and need and driven by what they call "the ruthless pursuit of affordability." Polak has been doing this work for years, and Warwick has extensive experience in both business and philanthropy. Together, they show how their design principles and vision can enable unapologetic capitalists to supply the very poor with clean drinking water, electricity, irrigation, housing, education, healthcare, and other necessities at a fraction of the usual cost and at profit margins attractive to investors.

== Citations ==
- D-Rev: Mission
- D-Rev: People
- Paul Polak, Out of Poverty: What Works When Traditional Methods Fail, San Francisco: Berrett-Koehler Publishers, Inc., 2008, p. 9.
