= Michelle Kaufmann =

American architect and designer

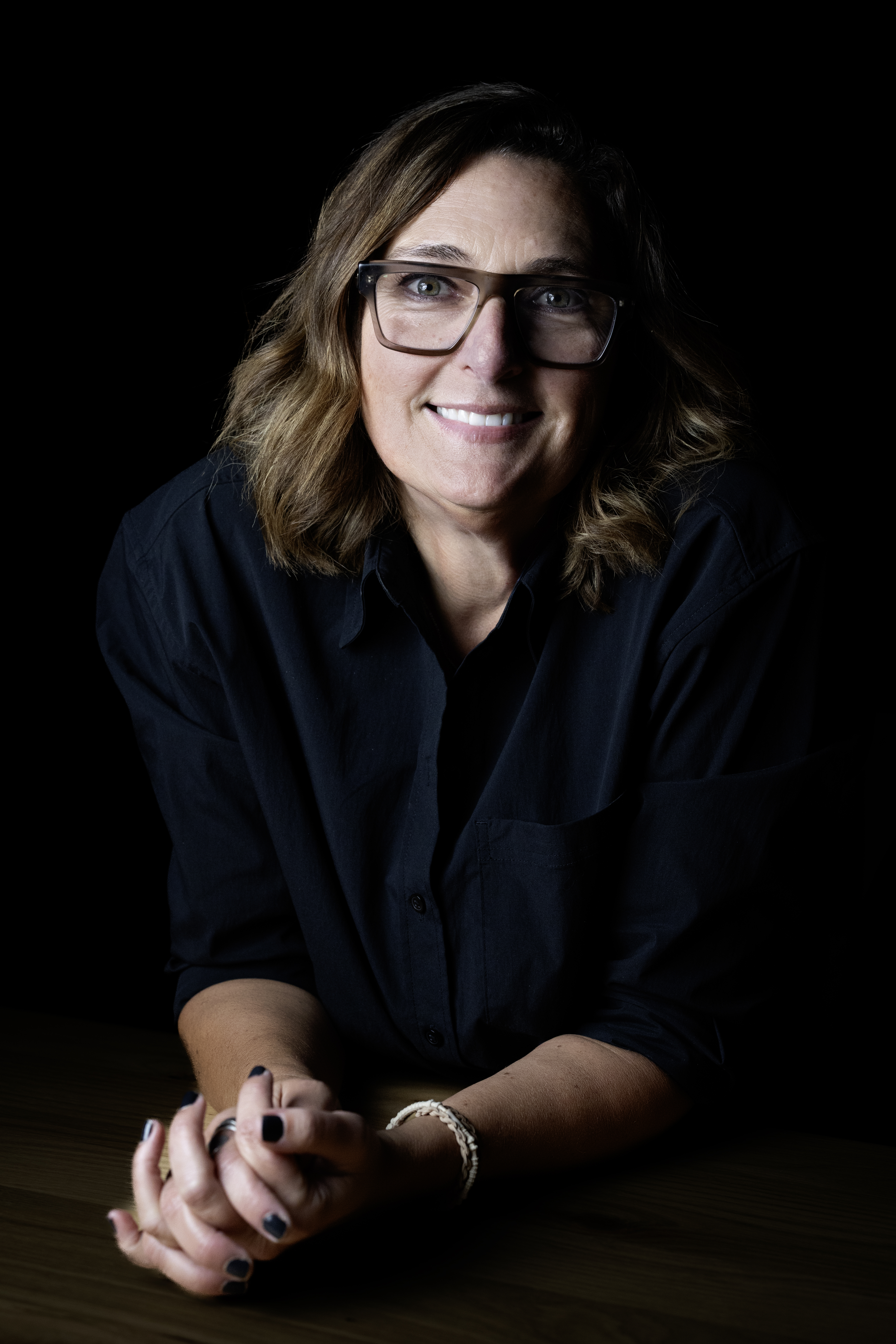
Michelle Kaufman in 2026

Michelle Kaufmann is an American architect and designer known for her work in sustainable architecture, prefabricated housing and research into new building systems. She founded Michelle Kaufmann Designs, where her projects included the Glidehouse, MKLotus and MKSolaire. She later worked with Google X on research into architecture and construction and co-founded the technology company Flux.

Kaufmann later joined Google, where she has led research and development for built environments, including works connected with company Bay View campus and research into adaptable, low-carbon mass timber buildings.

== Career ==
Michelle Kaufmann's first project, titled Glidehouse, was designed by Kaufmann and her husband, Kevin Cullen, in 2004. A full-size replica of this home was built for the National Building Museum in Washington, D.C. from May 2006 through June 2007 as a part of the exhibit The Green House: New Directions in Sustainable Architecture and Design. The style is influenced by "Japanese homes, along with Eichler and Eames, as well as the rural farm buildings from" her "childhood in Iowa".

The first MKLotus designed by Michelle Kaufmann was built in front of San Francisco's City Hall in 2007 as a part of West Coast Green conference on sustainable building. This design is among the smallest of the open-space homes offered by MK designs. It includes a "front wrap-around deck and enclosed meditation garden" and is "Intended as a vacation or small stand-alone home". It uses the same sleek, geometric shapes as her other designs.

The MKSolaire was exhibited at the Museum of Science and Industry (Chicago) within a show titled "The Smart Home: Green and Wired", which was open from May 2008 to January 2009. The Solaire has been "redesigned to reflect the lifestyle of a couple looking to minimize home maintenance, maximize efficiency, and settle in to a space that not only is beautiful, but functional".

== Awards and honors ==
In 2007, Kaufmann was named the "Henry Ford of green homes" by Sierra magazine, published by the Sierra Club. Kaufmann’s work is widely published and her homes have been showcased in a number of museums, including the National Building Museum, the Vancouver Art Center, the Museum of Contemporary Art, Los Angeles, and most recently, in the "Smart Home: Green and Wired" exhibit at the Museum of Science and Industry in Chicago.

== Written works ==
- Prefab Green (published by Gibbs Smith, ISBN 978-1-4236-0497-6)
