= Reciprocating saw =

Type of machine powered saw

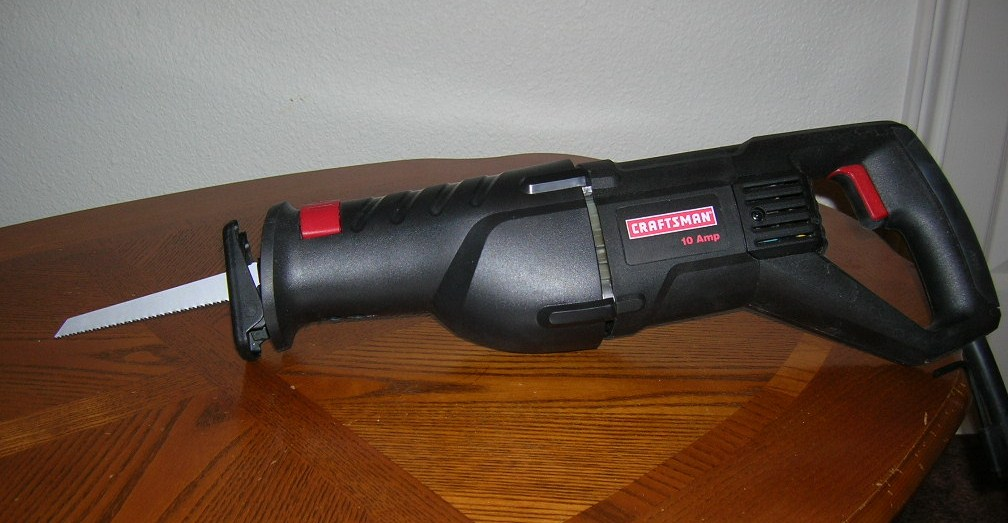
Hand-held sabre saws are examples of a variable-speed, reciprocating saw

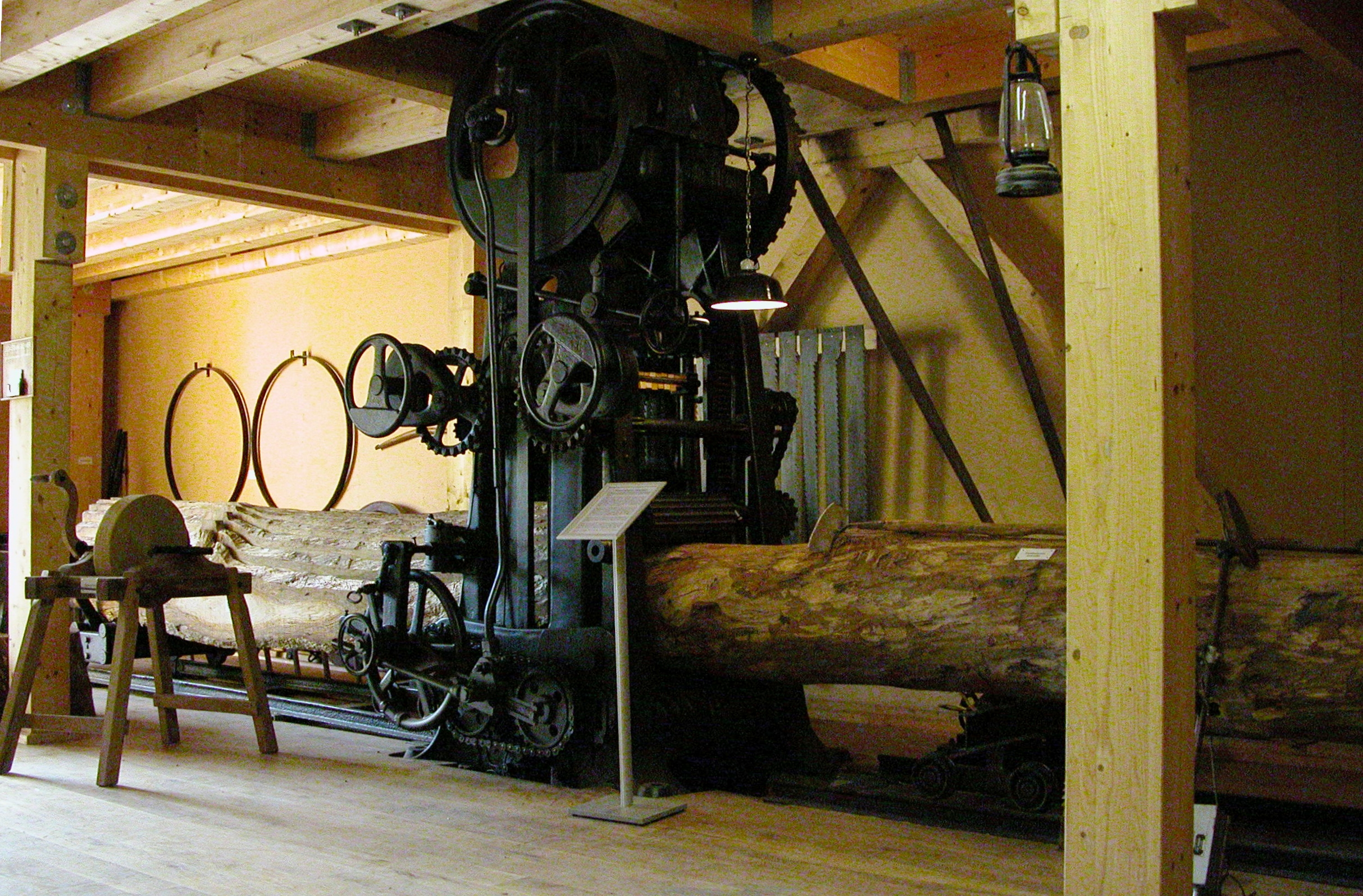
Reciprocating saw at the Roscheider Hof Open Air Museum

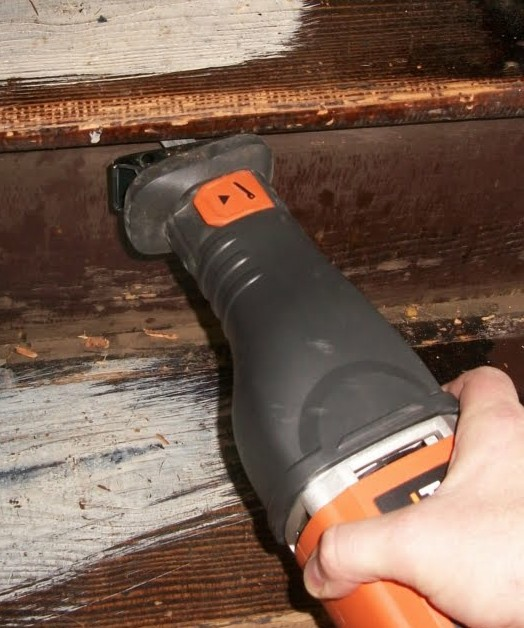
Reciprocating saws have many uses; here, one is shown cutting through hard-to-remove nails in a staircase.

A reciprocating saw is a type of handheld, small, machine-powered saw, in which the cutting action is achieved through a push-and-pull ("reciprocating") or back-and-forth motion of the blade. The original trade name, Sawzall, is often used in the United States, where Milwaukee Electric Tool first produced a tool of this type in 1951.

The noun "Sawzall" is commonly applied to a smaller type of battery-powered or line powered handheld saw used in construction and demolition work, as well as in gardening and the pruning of larger trees or plants. This type of saw, also known as a hognose, recip saw, or sawsaw, has a large blade, resembling that of a jigsaw, and a handle oriented to allow the saw to be used comfortably on vertical surfaces. The typical design of this tool has a foot at the base of the blade, also similar to that of a jigsaw. The user holds or rests the foot on the surface being cut, thus countering the tendency of the blade to push away from or pull towards the cut as it travels through its movement.

== Design ==
Designs range widely in power, speed, and features, from less powerful portable, handheld models that are usually shaped like a cordless drill, to high-powered, high-speed, corded models designed for heavy construction and demolition work. Modern reciprocating saws almost all have adjustable speed setting, either via trigger sensitivity or with a dial. Another feature that has become important to the way these saws are used is the inclusion of an orbital action, consisting of oscillating the traversed reciprocation in an up-and-down fashion (perpendicular to the motion of cut), causing the tip of the blade to move in an oval pattern, up-and-down as well as back-and-forth. This feature is primarily for wood or the pruning of tree branches, allowing quick cuts.

A reciprocating saw is a popular tool used by many window fitters, gardeners, landscape architects and construction workers, as well as emergency rescue workers. Variants and accessories are available for specialized uses, such as clamps and long blades for cutting large pipes.

Blades are available for a variety of materials and uses; common blades include those designed for cutting metal, wood, composites or drywall, among other materials. Furthermore, most of these blade types come with a variety of tooth designs intended for special purposes, such as plant and shrub pruning, demolition work, clean cutting, or use on contaminated materials. Abrasive, coated blades are also available, for hard materials like tile, rock or stone.

The term reciprocating saw (or oscillating saw) is also applied, generically, to any saw which cuts with a back-and-forth motion. These include:

- Jigsaw
- Scroll saw
- Sabre saw
- Rotary reciprocating saw

Powered reciprocating tools are also found in surgery and dental surgery, where they are used in operations that require cutting or grinding of bone.

== Mechanism ==
Operation of reciprocating saw swashplate mechanism

The reciprocating action may be produced in several ways. A crank or Scotch yoke type drive may be used, a swashplate type drive, a captive cam or eccentric, barrel cam, or other rotary to linear drive. Modern tools are built with variants of all of these mechanisms. Eccentric cam, crank and scotch yoke drives need balance weights to reduce vibration in the plane of the rotating element, and may still exhibit vibration that is objectionable to a user of a handheld saw and can lead to difficulty in controlling a cut. The swash plate drive has the advantage that there is little rotational out of balance, so the principal vibration is in line with the blade. This is generally controllable by keeping the foot of a handheld tool against the work.

== See also ==
- Power hacksaw
