= Sensa (diet) =

Diet aid created by neurologist Alan Hirsch

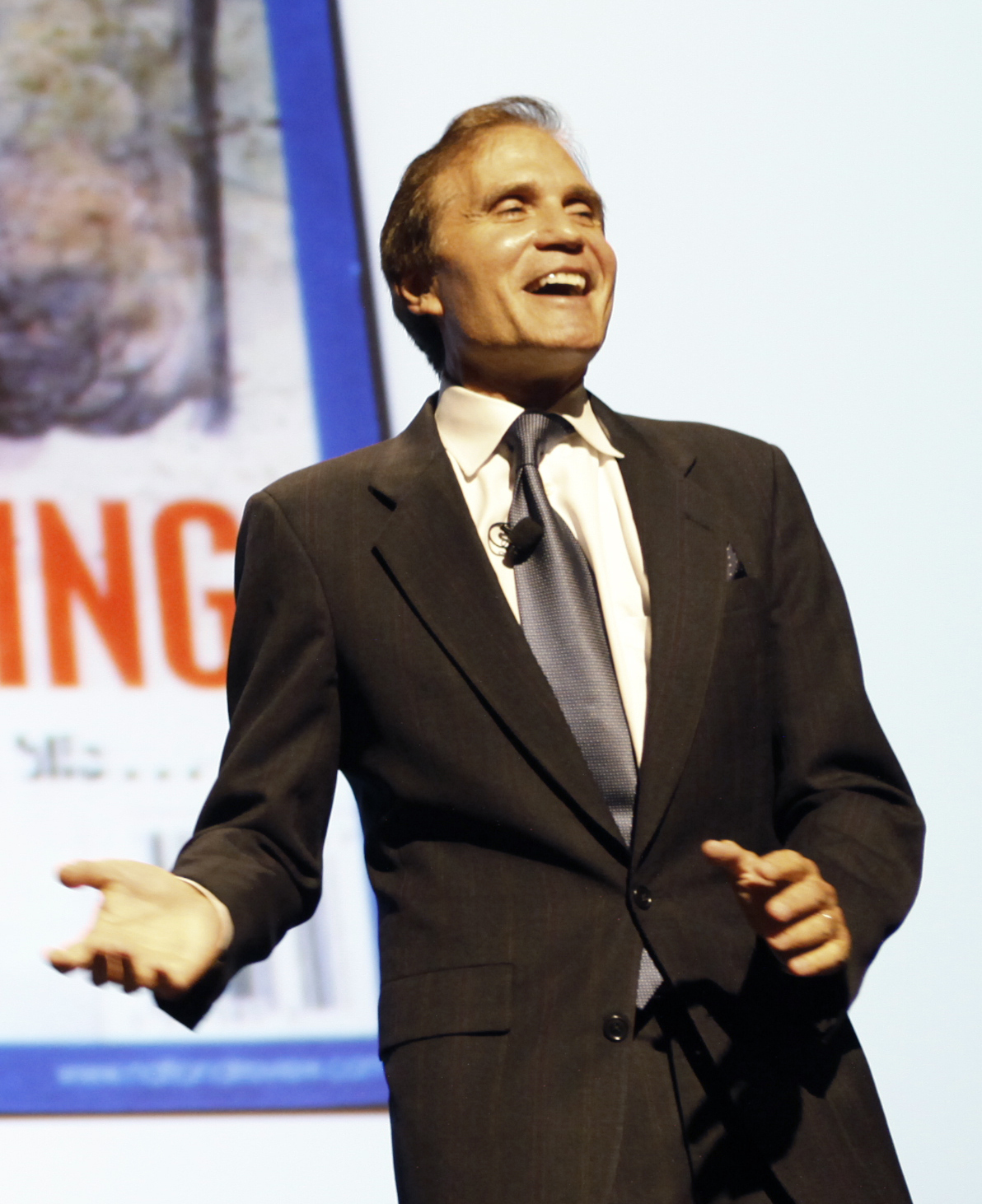
Alan Hirsch presenting at Cusp Conference 2009

Sensa is an American brand of diet aid created by Alan Hirsch, an American neurologist and psychiatrist. The product lacks scientific evidence of effect and has been the subject of controversy and lawsuits. Following a $26 million fine by the U.S. Federal Trade Commission in 2014, the company ceased operations.

== Claims ==
According to the advertisements promoting the Sensa diet, you can eat your favorite foods without counting calories, deprivation, or cravings. All that is needed is to sprinkle all the food one eats with flavor-enhancing Sensa crystals, and that will result in weight-loss.

These "Sensa crystals" were developed by Alan Hirsch, MD, the founder and neurologic director of the Smell and Taste Treatment and Research Foundation in Chicago. The Sensa crystals (or "tastants") are said to promote feelings of fullness and, ultimately, weight loss. If a person sticks with Sensa, the website claims that a person could lose 30 pounds in six months.

== Background ==
Hirsch says there was a peer-reviewed study by the Endocrine Society supporting the claim that subjects lost over thirty pounds using Sensa. However, the Endocrine Society says they did not review the study. On ABC's news magazine program 20/20, the Endocrine Society stated they "were surprised and troubled by the promotional nature of his presentation."

Sensa was owned and marketed by Sensa Products, LLC, its parent company, Sensa, Inc., formerly Intelligent Beauty, Inc. The CEO of Sensa Products, LLC was Adam Goldenberg. Intelligent Beauty was renamed JustFab Inc and is now known as TechStyle. Adam is currently the co-CEO of TechStyle

== Controversy and lawsuits ==
None of Sensa's internal studies have been confirmed by peer-reviewed medical journals.

Critiques of Sensa-claimed research and Dr. Hirsch's research include:

- (1) The studies were not blinded in any directions (both researchers and subjects knew who was given Sensa and who was given a placebo, which is a conflict of interest and exposes the study to outcomes driven by the placebo effect).
- (2) The studies have not been open to peer review or verified by any independent medical or health organization.
- (3) The results have not been duplicated.
- (4) All studies have been conducted by organizations that were affiliated with Sensa and stand to gain financial compensation (conflicts of interests).
- (5) Sensa's statistical claims in their infomercials largely contradict information shown on product patents.
- (6) Experts from the fields of medicine that Sensa is derived from and medical experts which study and treat health-weight issues have consistently disagreed with the scientific reasoning behind Sensa, noting on numerous occasions that none of the ingredients in Sensa have shown any of the properties that the product is claimed to have.

In 2013, the marketers of Sensa paid US$905,000 (equivalent to $1,250,839 in 2025) to settle false advertising charges in California after an investigation by the Statewide Nutritional Supplement Task Force determined they were making unsubstantiated claims regarding the efficacy of their products and making unauthorized charges to customers.

On January 7, 2014, the Federal Trade Commission (FTC) assessed a $26.5 million fine against the company to settle charges of unfounded weight-loss claims. Under the order, the defendants are barred from making weight-loss claims about dietary supplements, foods, or drugs, unless they have two adequate and well-controlled human clinical studies supporting the claims; making any other health-related claim unless it is supported by competent and reliable scientific tests, analyses, research, or studies; and misrepresenting any scientific evidence. In October 2014, Sensa declared insolvency and ceased operations, and entered into an assignment for the benefit of creditors. In December 2014, the FTC announced that it was sending 477,083 refund checks totaling $26,023,329 to consumers who purchased the weight-loss supplement.
