= Market Systems Resilience Index =

Economic indicator

The Market Systems Resilience Index (MSRI) measures the capacity of a market system to adapt and adjust to external and internal shocks. It guides international development practitioners in the process of conducting resilience assessments. It is used as a survey-based tool in program evaluation to measure impact as well as to monitor active projects for purposes of adaptive management.

The MSRI incorporates resilience measurement of both market system actors and households. It is composed of 5 principles and 11 determinants, following standards set by the Donor Committee for Enterprise Development (DCED) and integrated with household-level agroecosystem indicators of resilience. The MSRI has been validated through research in multiple countries in Africa and Asia. It was first developed by International Development Enterprises in 2018 and was adapted based on the market resilience methods and guidance developed under the USAID Center for Resilience project, Resilience Evaluation Analysis and Learning (REAL). Further adaptation followed the United States Agency for International Development MSR framework for measurement released by the USAID Bureau of Food Security. The MSRI builds upon the agroecological indicators identified in the Self-evaluation and Holistic Assessment of climate Resilience of farmers and Pastoralists (SHARP) tool, developed by the Food and Agriculture Organization of the United Nations (FAO) to understand and incorporate the situations, concerns, and interests of farmers and pastoralists relating to climate resilience and agriculture.
