= Matthew Diffee =

American cartoonist

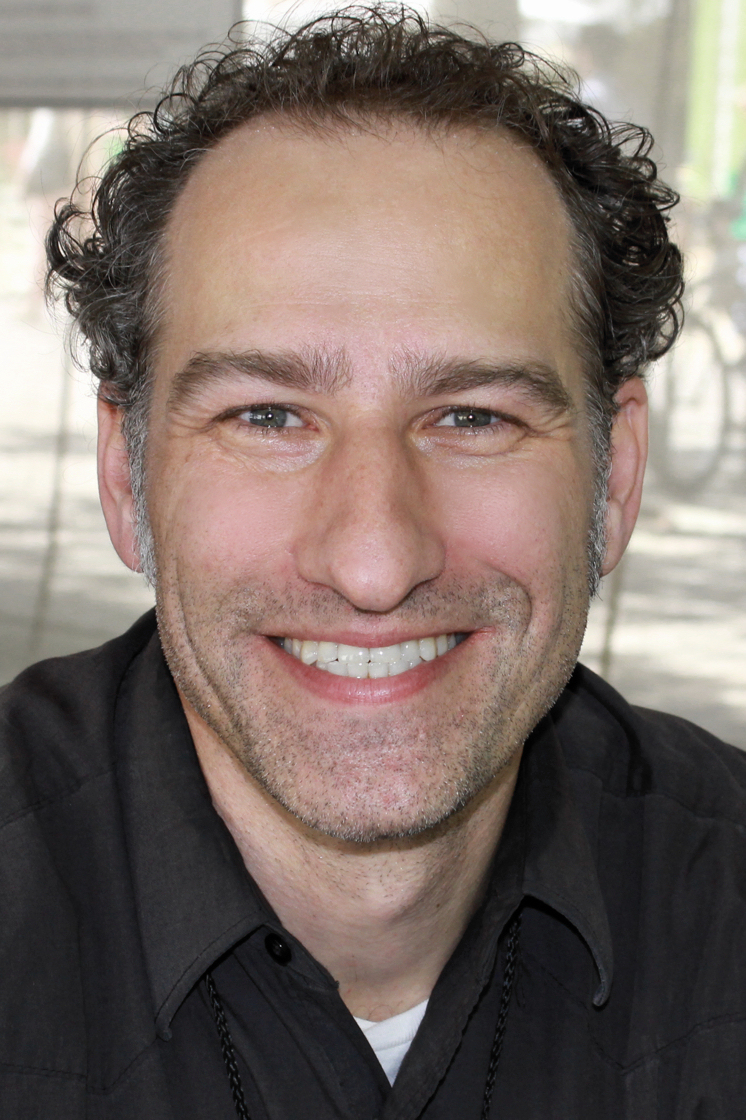
- Diffee at the 2015 Texas Book Festival
- Born: Denton, Texas
- Occupation: Cartoonist
- Website: www.matthewdiffee.com

Matthew "Matt" Diffee is an American cartoonist whose works appear in the New Yorker magazine.

== Biography ==
Diffee was born in Denton, Texas and grew up in Texas and North Carolina. The son of an airline pilot, he attended Bob Jones University, planning to become a Christian missionary. While at Bob Jones, he co-founded a comedy troupe, the Leaping Pickes, whose motto was, "We put the fun in fundamentalism." Diffee's role in the group involved telling jokes, juggling and playing the banjo.

He has a background in art and stand-up comedy, which he still performs from time to time. As a struggling artist, he took various day jobs, including road work, construction, and as a convenience store cashier.

Diffee moved from Boston, Massachusetts to New York and began contributing to the New Yorker in 1999, after winning a cartoon contest the magazine and the Algonquin Hotel sponsored for an all-cartoon issue, in the process meeting Robert Mankoff, the cartoon editor, in person. Mankoff encouraged Diffee to contribute to the magazine. After three weeks of submission Mankoff chose one cartoon, which became Diffee's first published work. For the next year Diffee submitted fifteen cartoons per week; the magazine published a total of four. The next year Diffee sold eight cartoons to the magazine, each at the standard rate of $675. He remains a devout Christian, not consuming alcohol and refusing to draw cartoons about sex.

Diffee's first book, The Rejection Collection, was a compilation of cartoons by various artists that had been rejected from the magazine along with questionnaires and portraits of each artist. In an interview he noted that 90% of even a successful freelance cartoonist's works are rejected, and that most cartoonists are known only for their work, not their personal lives. Many rejected cartoons are good, he explained, but inappropriate for the magazine because they are politically incorrect or sexually suggestive: "...the idea that the cartoonist did it, and actually pitched it to the New Yorker, makes it even funnier to me, like ‘what were they thinking’?" As of the book's publication, the magazine had published more than 100 of Diffee's cartoons, a significant accomplishment for a young cartoonist.

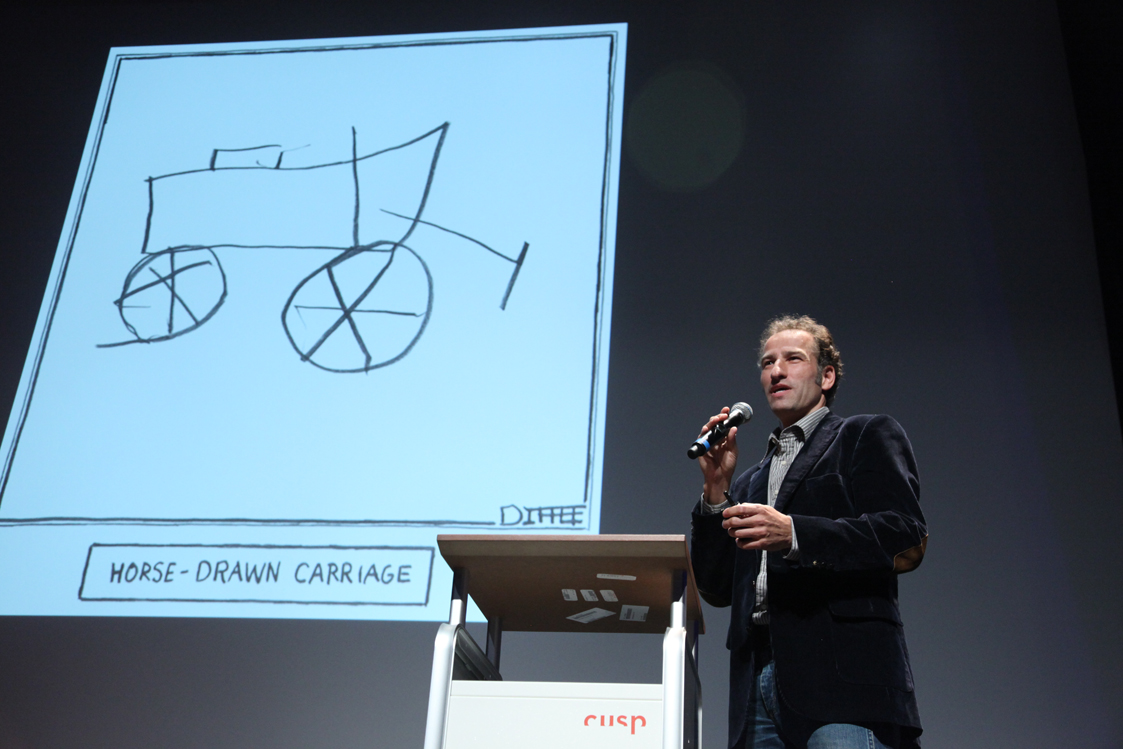
Matt Diffee presenting at Cusp Conference 2011, Chicago, Illinois

== Works ==
His works are mostly single-panel satirical pieces.

Diffee also produces other artwork, and has hosted "The Rejection Show", a monthly off-Broadway production devoted to rejected works by successful artists. He plays banjo and fiddle, and recently won a race in the sport of joggling (juggling while running), for which he will appear in an upcoming documentary.

He currently hosts The Steam Powered Hour, a "smart and cozy night of bluegrass music, standup comedy, and cartoons."

== Publications ==
- Matthew Diffee (2006-10-03). The Rejection Collection: Cartoons You Never Saw, and Never Will See, in The New Yorker. Simon Spotlight Entertainment. ISBN 1-4169-3339-5.
- Matthew Diffee (2007-10-30). The Rejection Collection Vol. 2: The Cream of the Crap. Simon Spotlight Entertainment. ISBN 978-1-4169-3401-1.
- Matthew Diffee (2015). Hand Drawn Jokes for Smart Attractive People. Scribner. ISBN 978-1-4767-4874-0.
