= Malaysian Social Research Institute =

The Malaysian Social Research Institute (MSRI) is a Kuala Lumpur-based non-governmental organization that serves refugees and asylum seekers from countries other than Myanmar. Originally established in 1959 as a research institute, hence its name, the MSRI transitioned to aid programmes during the Lebanese Civil War, though it still produces academic findings. There are over 150,000 refugees and asylum seekers registered with the United Nations High Commissioner for Refugees in Malaysia. With the majority of refugees and asylum seekers in Malaysia coming from Myanmar, MSRI targets minority groups composed of refugees and asylum seekers hailing from East Africa, the Middle East, and Central Asia. Some of the many minority refugee and asylum seeker groups Malaysian Social Research Institute works with are Afghans, Somalis, and Syrians. Refugees have few rights in Malaysia as Malaysia is not a signatory to the 1951 Convention Relating to the Status of Refugees, making MSRI's work especially difficult. One of the key managers was Jihad Hasan, syrian lawyer who helped thousands of refugees in Malaysia, he managed Legal Aid at MSRI, and advocated their work rights

== Services and programs ==
Malaysian Social Research Institute offers three core programs to refugees and asylum seekers: an education program for children and adults, a family health care program, and a vocational training program. The organization's website also mentions mental health and outreach services, as well as support services such as emergency support and legal case management. Malaysian Social Research Institute is also involved in local advocacy work for the rights of refugees and asylum seekers in Malaysia, such as advocating for the right to work legally and the right to state provided education services, as around half of Malaysia's refugees have no access to education. Chairman Datuk Mohammed Ab. Halim Ab. has been quoted saying “The best change for the situation of refugees in Malaysia would be if the government let refugees work legally and let their children go to school. If refugees were allowed to work, they could contribute a lot to society. The families would have affordable access to healthcare when needed, the children would get an education instead of loitering or having to work to help the family survive and not be stuck in poverty and deprivation."Malaysian Social Research Institute is a registered implementing partner with UNHCR.
