= Rotary saw =

Type of mechanical saw

A rotary saw, spiral cut saw, RotoZip or cut out tool is a type of mechanically powered saw used for making accurate cuts without the need for a pilot hole in wallboard, plywood, or another thin, solid material.

The Rotozip Tool Corp was a company started by Bob Kopras, an American drywall installer who pioneered this type of saw. Rotozip was later acquired by Bosch Tool Corp. in 2003.

This type of tool was originally developed for making cut-outs in drywall but it was later discovered that myriad other materials could easily be cut using the tool.

The design is similar to a small wood router but usually features only one handle for single handed operation. Bits look similar to a twist drill or end mill; some cut on the upward twist, and some cut downwards. The cutting edge on the flutes actually slices (either upwards or downwards) through the material which means that they can cut in any direction.

== Medical and emergency use ==
A rotary reciprocating saw is a type of saw that spins a cutting implement around a rotary axis, instead of thrusting it along a linear axis. The first use of such devices was in medicine, where cutting through bone warranted the need for a saw with minimal stroke length, and a cutting action that could be implemented through depth cut rather than a follow through cut. The timber industry now also uses this type of action to cut in the same manner. A particular manufacturer has a hand-held version for making difficult cuts, which would not be possible with other implements.

Firefighters also use rotary saws to cut holes through walls to access certain areas quickly to fight fires and rescue civilians.

== See also ==
- Reciprocating saw
- Radial arm saw
- Bone cutter (medical)
