= KickStart International =

Non-profitable social enterprise

- Established: 1991 (35 years ago)
- Legal status: 501(c)(3) organization
- Purpose: Poverty alleviation Food security Climate change adaptation Women's empowerment
- Headquarters: San Francisco
- Country: United States
- Methods: Irrigation-based solutions for poverty reduction
- Revenue: 6,415,655 United States dollar (2016)
- Total Assets: 3,003,637 United States dollar (2020)
- Website: www.kickstart.org

KickStart International is a nonprofit social enterprise headquartered in Nairobi, Kenya. KickStart designs and mass-markets climate-smart irrigation technology to smallholder farmers in sub-Saharan Africa, in order to enable a transition from subsistence agriculture to commercial irrigated agriculture. Donor funds are used to design the irrigation pumps, establish supply chains, demonstrate and promote the pumps, and educate farmers on the benefits and methods of small-scale irrigation.

== Background ==
Food supply across sub-Saharan Africa is highly unstable due to its unpredictable climate and water reserves. Only 6% of Africa's cultivated land is irrigated, limiting the volume of crops that can be grown out of season, but increased access to irrigation systems stands to increase food productivity by up to 50%.

== History ==
KickStart was founded in 1991 by Dr. Martin Fisher and Nick Moon. Fisher first went to Kenya on a Fulbright Fellowship to study the Appropriate Technology Movement, where he met Moon, who was in Kenya with the Voluntary Service Overseas (VSO). The two worked closely together on a variety of development interventions, including building rural water systems, constructing schools, and creating job training programs. Out of frustration with traditional development models, Fisher and Moon developed an alternative model for poverty alleviation. Their model was based on a five-step process to develop, launch and promote simple money-making tools that poor entrepreneurs could use to create their own profitable businesses. Together, they founded ApproTEC, which later became KickStart International in 2005.

Starting in 1998, KickStart began developing a line of manually operated irrigation pumps, designed to enable farmers to easily pull water from a river, pond, or shallow well, and pressurize it through a hose pipe to reach their crops. Through this small-scale technological intervention, farmer can harvest their crops year-round, facilitating a transition from rain-fed subsistence farming to year-round commercial irrigated agriculture. The MoneyMaker Max can pressurize water to a total height of 50 feet (15 m), pushing it through a hose pipe as far as 200 metres (660 ft), and can irrigate as much as two acres (0.81 ha) of land.

== Recognition ==
KickStart has received the following awards: Schwab Foundation's Outstanding Social Entrepreneurs (2003), US State Department "Innovation Award for the Empowerment of Women and Girls" (2012), Forbes Magazine Impact 30 List - World's leading social entrepreneurs (2011), Lemelson-MIT Award for Sustainability (2008), Social Capitalist Award Fast Company Magazine & the Monitor Group (2008), Skoll Award for Social Entrepreneurship (2005), Gleitsman Award of Achievement (2003).
