= Bucksaw =

Hand-powered frame saw

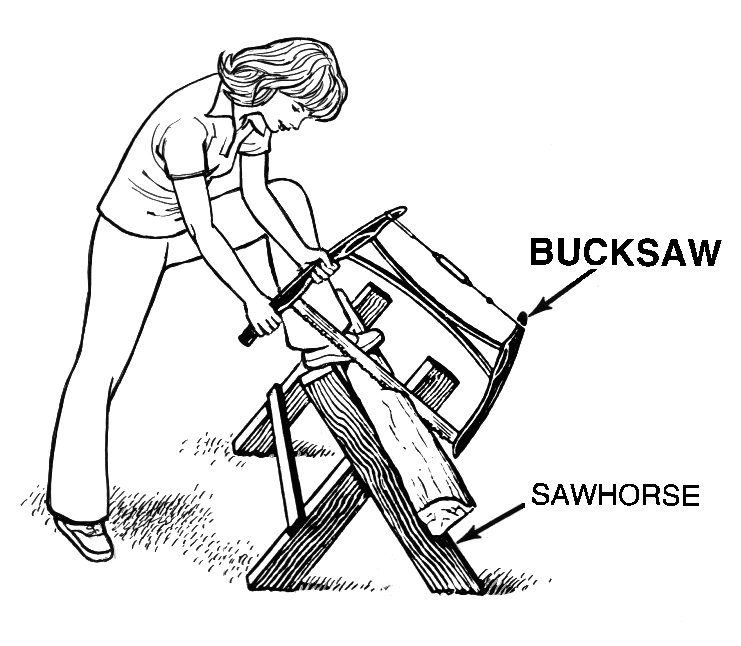
Using a bucksaw and sawhorse to cut a log

A bucksaw is a metal-framed crosscut saw in the shape of a bow with a coarse wide blade generally used with a sawbuck to cut logs or firewood to length (bucking). This type of saw is also known as a bow saw, Swede saw, bushman saw, and Finn saw. Modern bucksaws usually have a metal frame ("H" or C-shaped) and a removable blade with coarse teeth held in tension by the frame. Lightweight portable or foldable models used for camping or back-packing are also available. It is often referred to as a bucksaw in the North American hardware market, but that term traditionally refers to a different type of saw with a wooden frame.

== Description ==
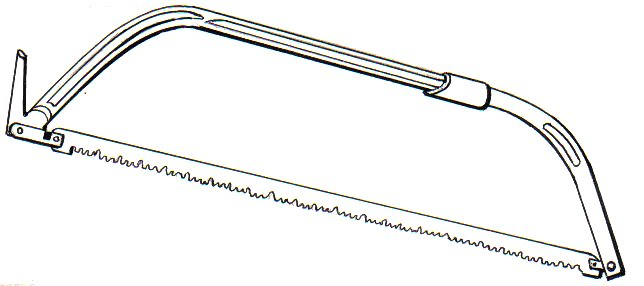
A modern bucksaw

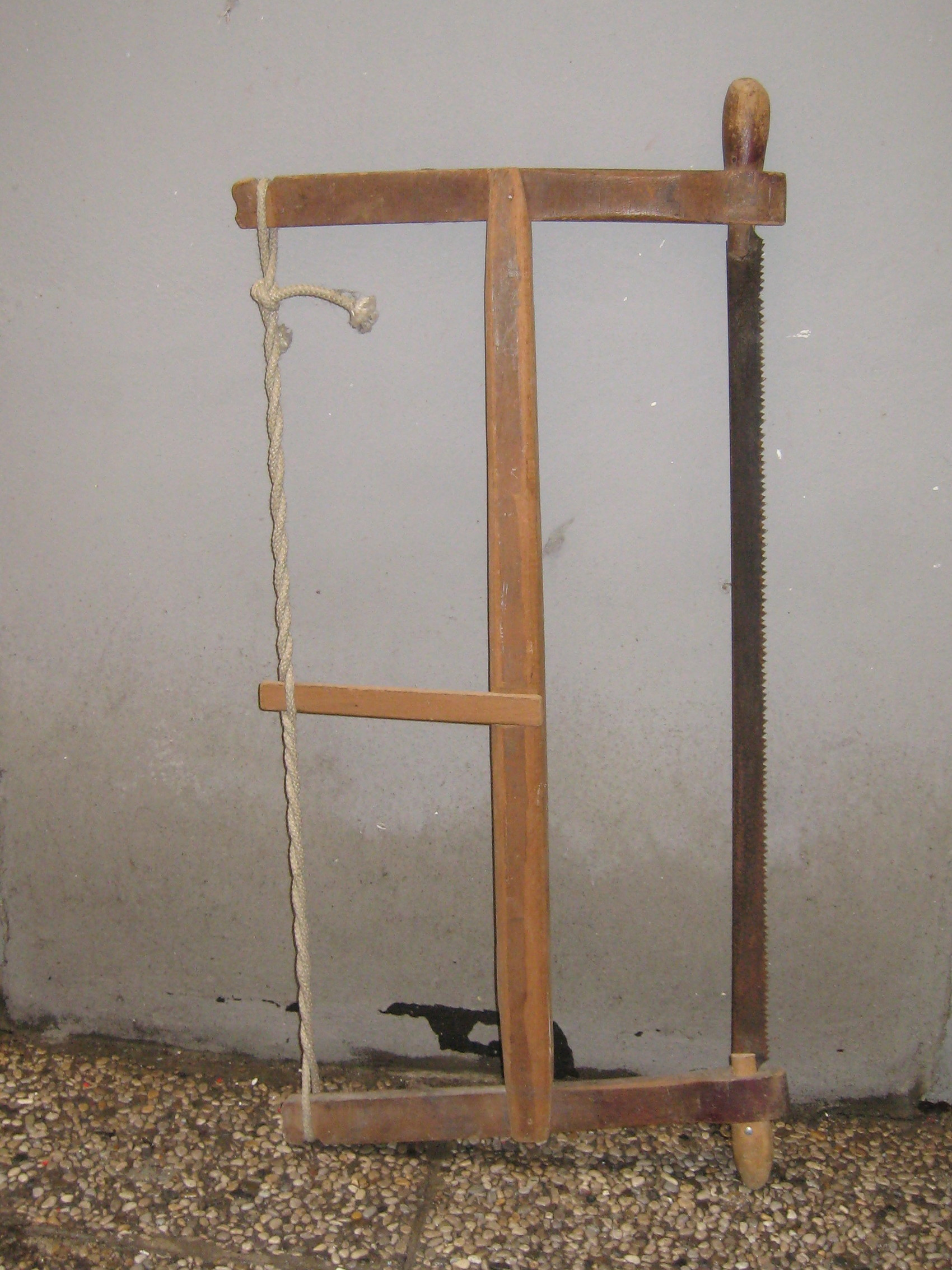
A traditional bucksaw

A bucksaw is a crosscut saw: it is designed to cut across the grain. The width of the blade is constant from the teeth to the back. It is meant to cut wood fibers that are under tension, and is thick so that it is more difficult to bend on the push stroke. It can be either a one or two-man saw. Coopers often use bucksaws in their work.

Traditionally, a bucksaw is a woodworking tool used for straight or curved cuts. A bucksaw is a type of frame saw. Its thin blade is held in tension by a frame. In English and American vocabulary it denotes a toothed blade suspended between two long narrow handles called cheeks supported and separated by a thin stretcher in the center of the handles, making a wide H shape. The cheeks form the uprights of the H, the stretcher the crossbar of the H.

The blade is kept in tension with a turnbuckle or a twisted cord parallel to the blade between the two cheeks but on the opposite side of the stretcher. If a cord is used, it is twisted with a toggle attached to one loop of the cord, adding tension. The toggle hits the stretcher, which keeps the cord from untwisting. A finer version of the saw uses a narrow blade of a 1/4 inch (6 mm) or less, with handles that allow the user to hold the saw and turn the blade. In this context it is also known as a turning saw, which is larger than a coping or fret saw.

== Uses ==
Bucksaws can be used for a number of tasks like clearing land, chopping firewood, cutting lumber, and sometimes kept handy for small logging projects. Due to their portability, these hand tools are often preferred by people that like to go camping and enjoy the outdoors lifestyle. Bucksaws feature coarse teeth that allow them to work with very big timber and are designed to allow replacing the blades after extensive woodworking projects.

If people use them for furnishing crafts, the blades can be substituted with more polished ones. The cuts produced with these smaller toothed blades are smoother and cleaner. The advantage of this tool is that electric power (or cord) is not needed to use it, and its affordability makes easily replaceable.

The bucksaw was used both in ancient China and the Hellenistic period, and developed from earlier saws. The term 'bucksaw' has also been applied to a type of chainsaw with a large, circular guide bar. The name 'Swede saw' probably derived from the ovate metal tubular frame version, invented in the 1920s by the Swedish company Sandvikens Jernverk, and additional patents by two Swedish immigrants to the US. Modern versions all share those common features.

== See also ==
- Hacksaw
