= Compass saw =

Type of saw used for making curved cuts

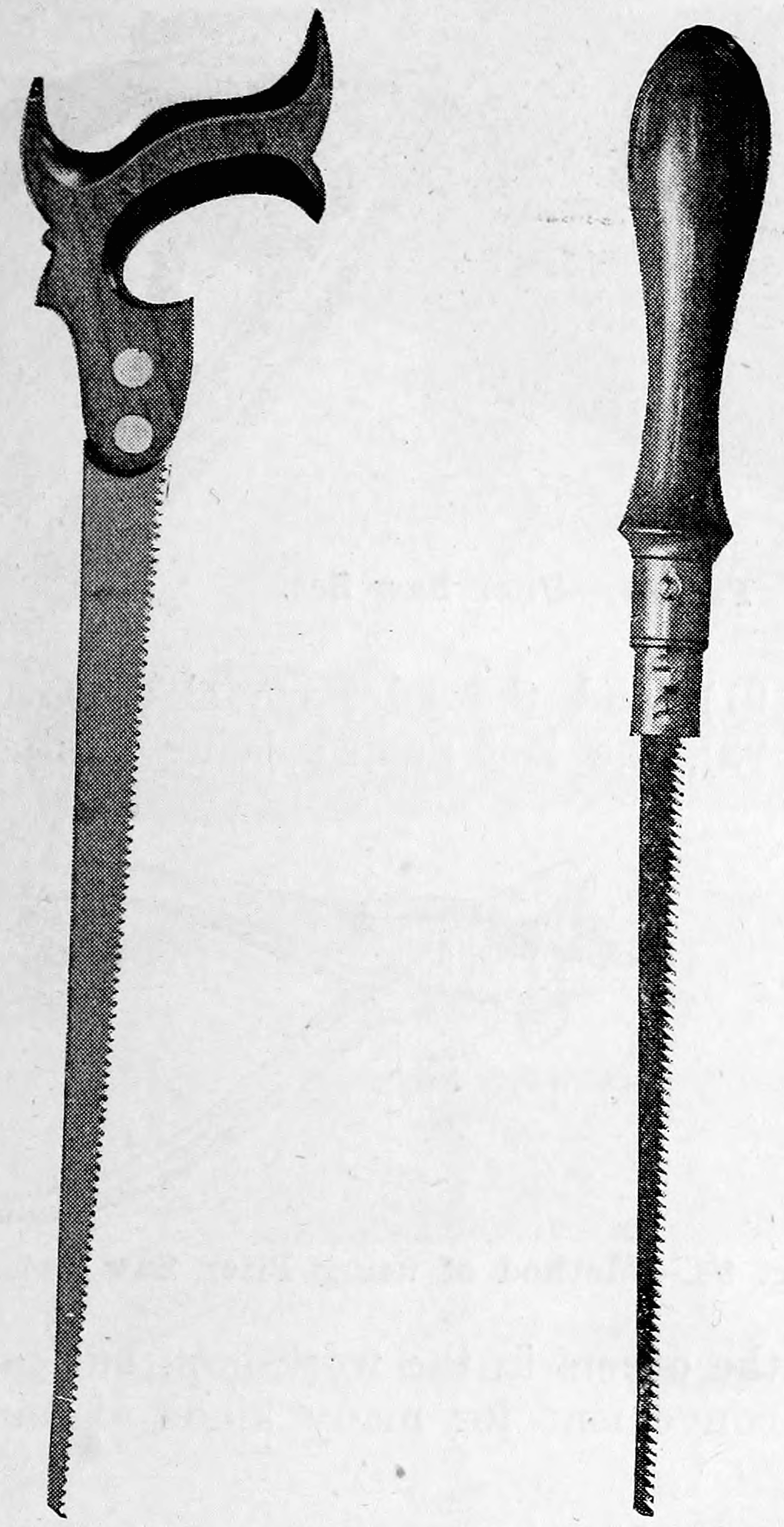
A compass saw

A compass saw is a type of saw used for making curved cuts known as compasses, particularly in confined spaces where a larger saw would not fit.

== Characteristics ==
Compass saws have a narrow, tapered blade usually ending in a sharp point, typically with a tooth pitch of 2.5 to 3 mm (eight to ten teeth per inch), but down to 1.3 mm (up to 20 teeth per inch) for harder materials and as long as 5 mm (as few as five teeth per inch) for softer materials. They have a curved, light "pistol grip" handle, designed for work in confined spaces and overhead.

The blade of a compass saw may be fixed or retractable, and blades are typically interchangeable. Partially retracting the blade can prevent flexing and breaking when cutting harder materials.

Compass saws are suitable for cutting softer woods, plastic, drywall, and non-ferrous metals. The pointed tip of the blade can be used to penetrate softer materials without the need for a pilot hole.

=== Comparison with other types of saws ===
Compared with other saws designed for cutting curves, such as coping or fretsaws, compass saws have a larger blade and longer pitch (fewer teeth per inch). This allows them to cut faster, and to cut through thicker materials, but leaves a rougher finish.

Compared with drywall saws, compass saws typically have a longer blade – at 15 to 30 centimetres (5.9 to 12 in) – and shorter pitch (more teeth per inch).

Keyhole saws, also called padsaws or jab saws, feature shorter, finer blades and (often) straight handles, and are suitable for cutting extremely tight curves.
