= Two-man saw =

Saw designed for use by two sawyers

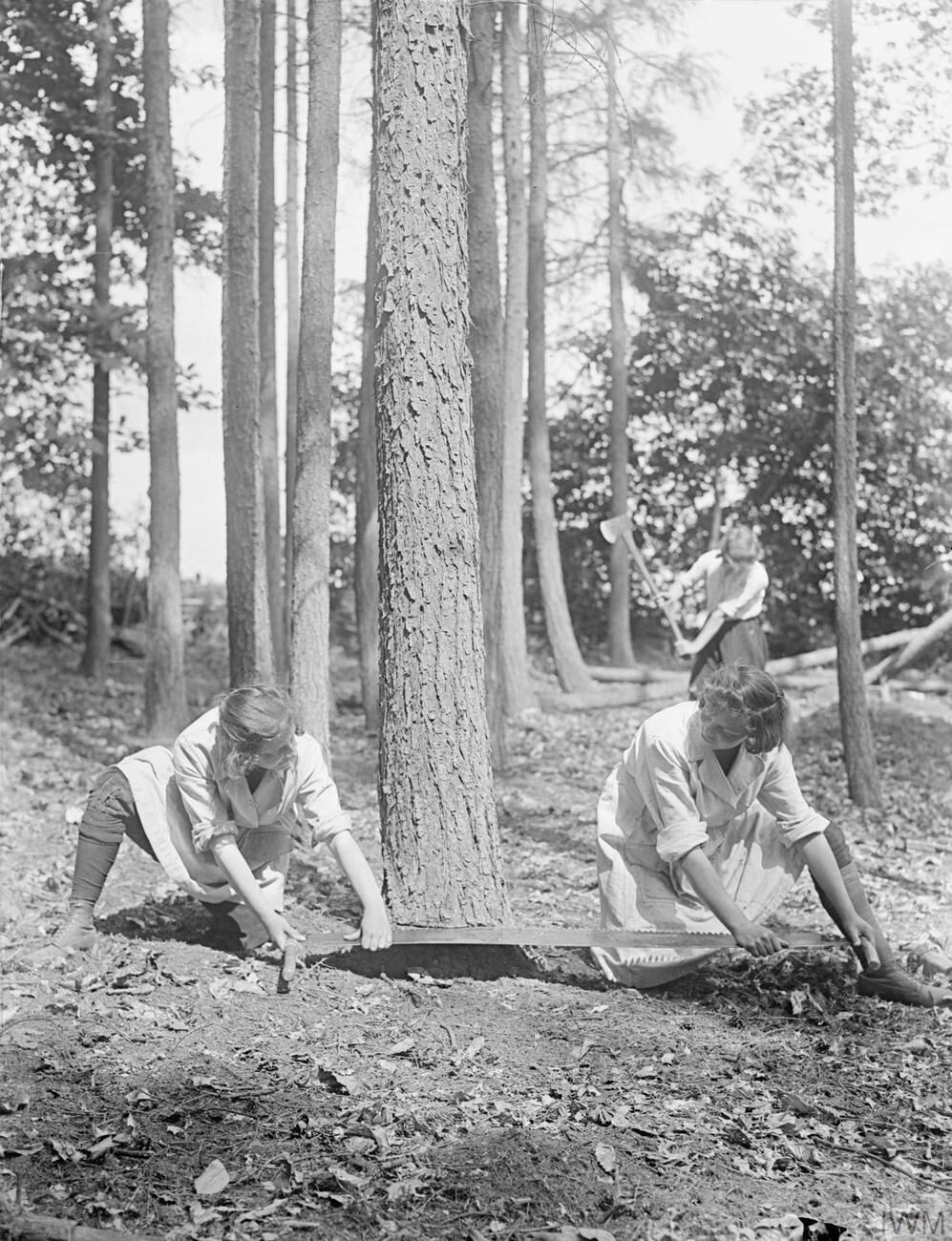
Two members of the Forestry Corps sawing the base of a tree in the United Kingdom, 1914

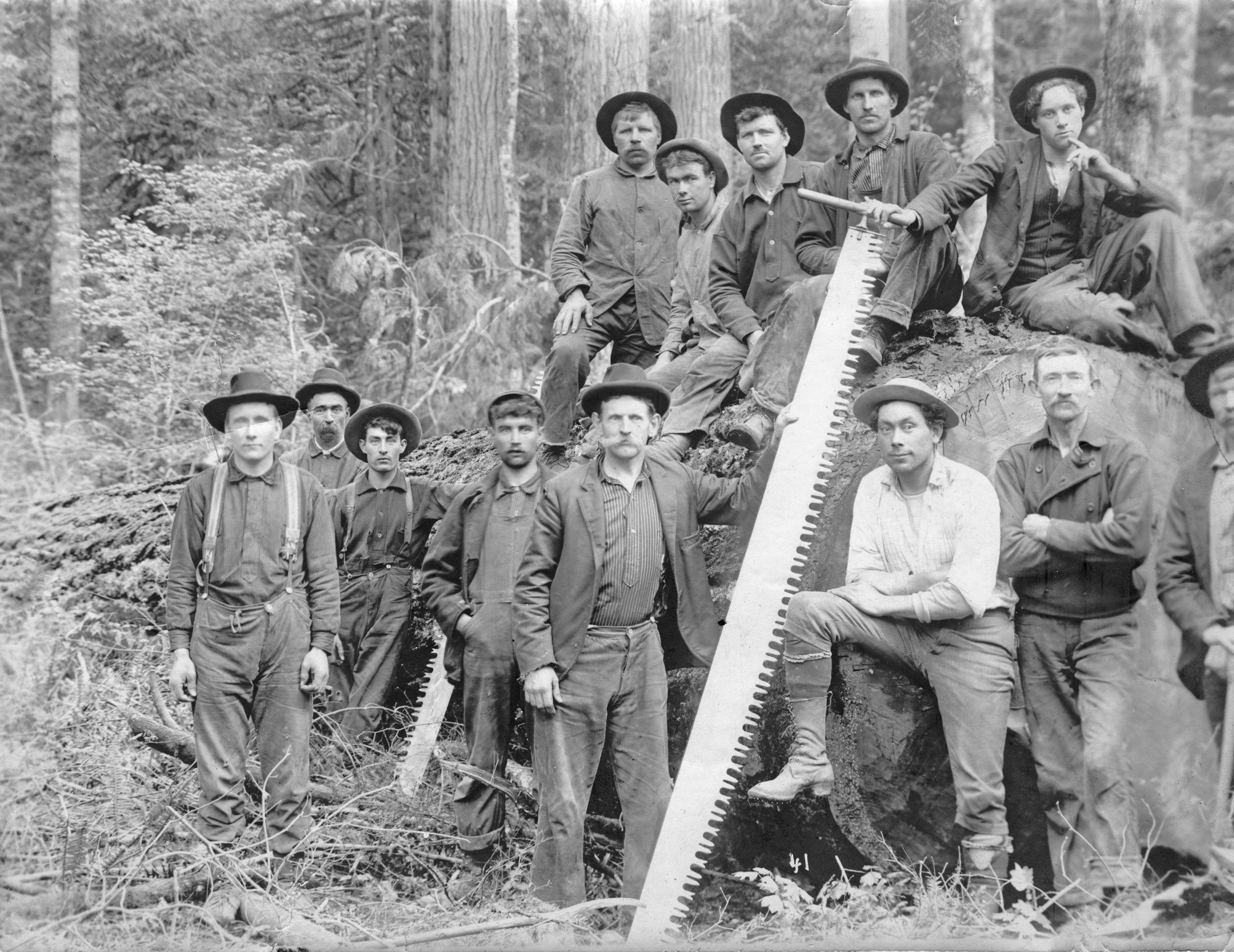
Two-man saw in Oregon

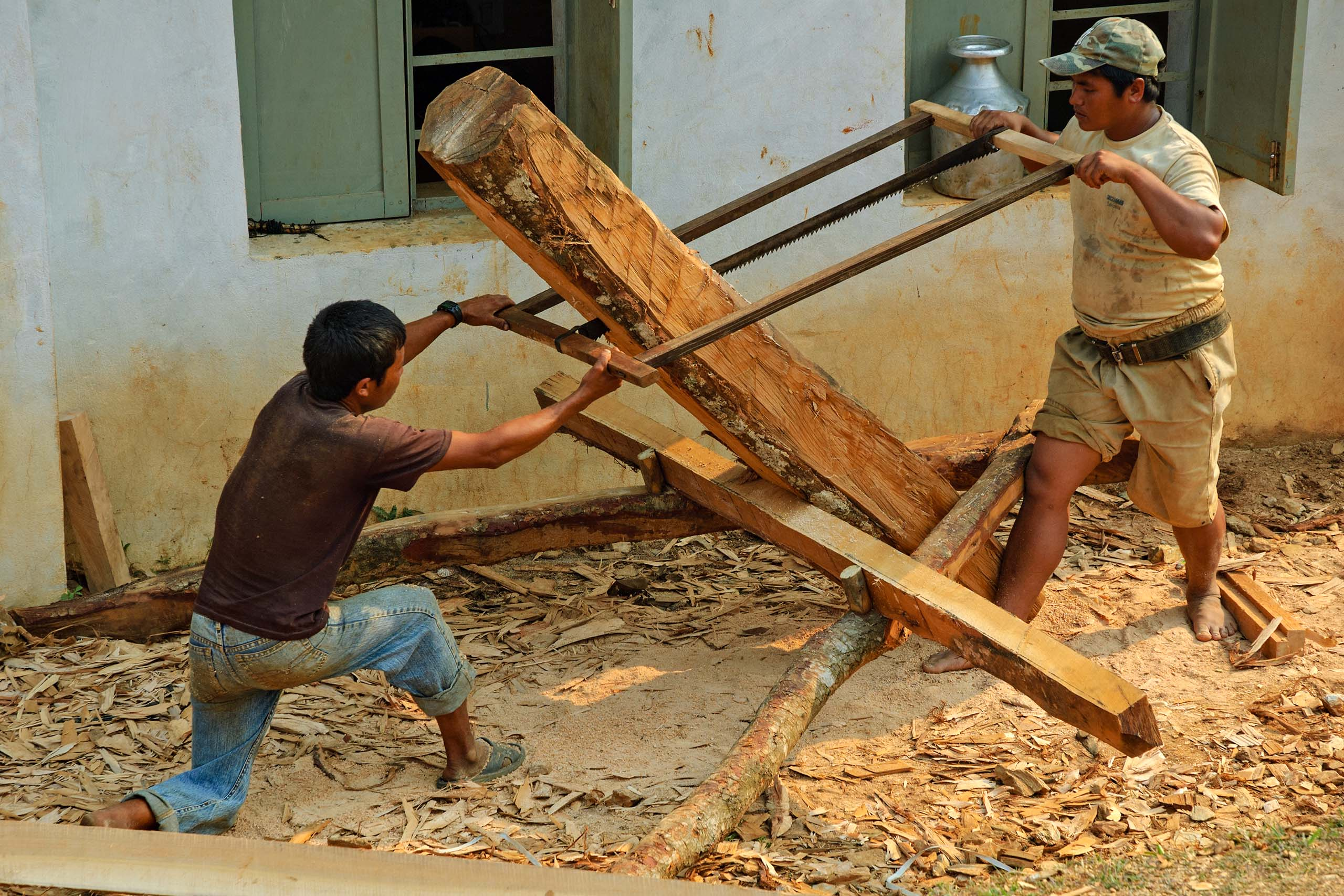
Two-man saw used by carpenters to saw planks from a tree trunk by hand, Dhading, Nepal

A two-man saw (known colloquially as a "misery whip") is a saw designed for use by two sawyers. While some modern chainsaws are so large that they require two persons to control, two-man crosscut saws were primarily important when human power was used. Such a saw would typically be 1 to 4 m (4 to 12 feet) long, and sometimes up to 5 m (16 feet), with a handle at each end. In some cases, such as when felling Giant sequoias, sawblades could be brazed together end-to-end in order to create longer saws.

The technique in using a two-man saw involved a sawyer standing at each end. Together the sawyers would alternate pulling the saw through the wood. If the kerf began closing, causing the saw to bind, wedges would be inserted behind the sawblade in order to keep the kerf open. Cutting from underneath a suspended log, called "underbucking", might also have been used if binding became a big problem.

Many variations on the design were used, but they mainly fell into two types. Felling saws were used to fell the trees, and bucking saws were used to cut felled trees into log lengths for the sawmill. The two applications require slightly different designs: a felling saw has a narrower blade, allowing wedges to be more easily inserted, while a bucking saw has a wider blade, giving it more strength.

Two-man saws were designed to cut in both directions. Careful tooth design was necessary to clear the sawdust during the cut.

Two-man saws were known to the ancient Romans, but first became common in Europe in the mid-15th century. In America, crosscut saws were used as early as the mid-17th century, but felling saws only began to replace axes for felling trees in the late 19th century.

Some Japanese saws are used by two persons, although they are of a different design.

== See also ==
- Saw pit
- Whipsaw
