= Clemson Bros., Inc =

American saw manufacturer

Clemson Bros. Inc., Middletown, New York, United States, was a major manufacturer of saws (especially hacksaws) and lawnmowers, founded by George Nathan Clemson.

As of March 2014, the former Clemson Brothers' buildings were owned by Heritage Restoration Properties. A craft brewery opened there on October 10, 2015.
