= Fretwork =

Interlaced decorative design

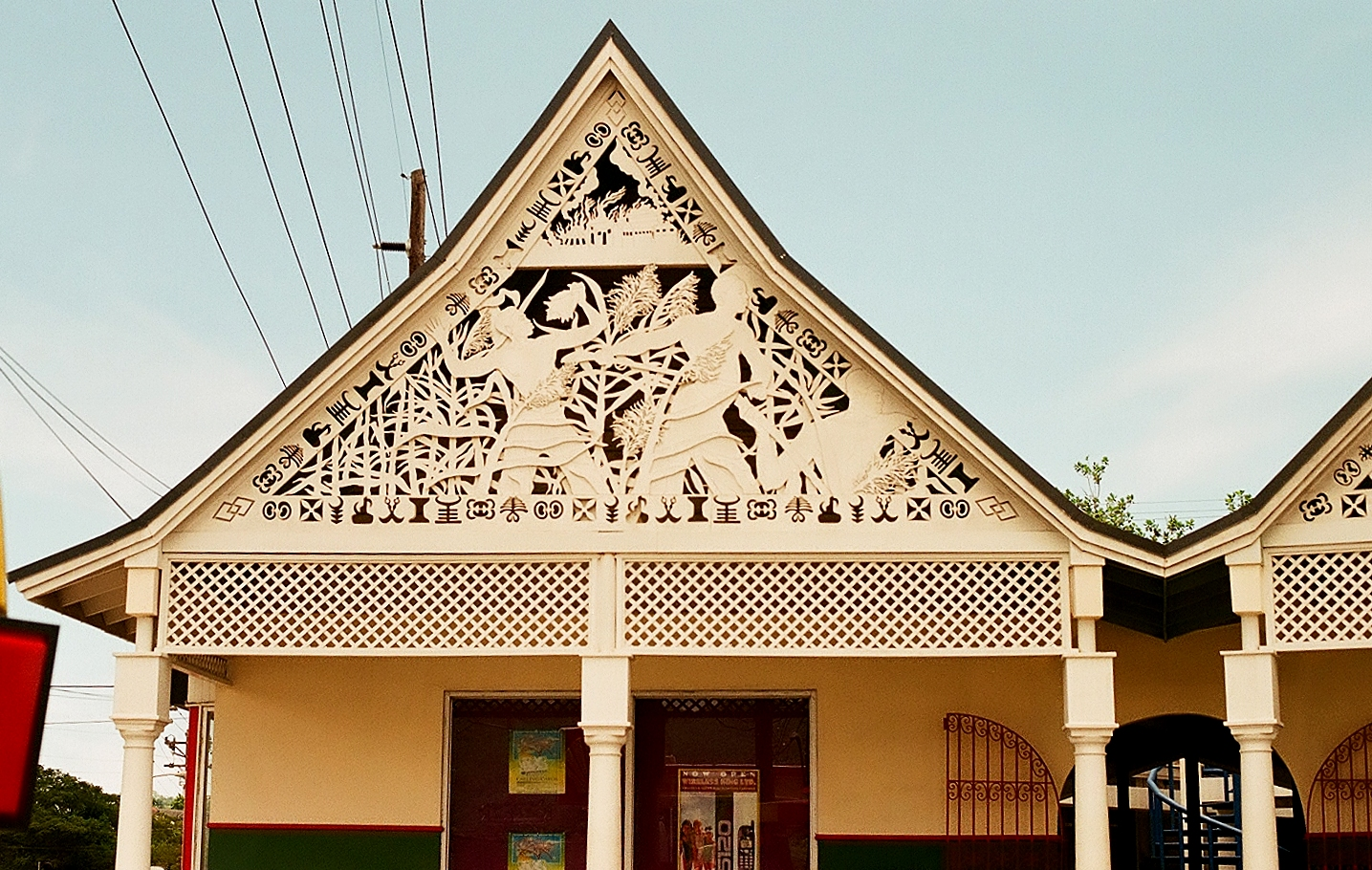
Gable end fretwork at a shopping center in Jamaica

Fretwork is an interlaced decorative design that is either carved in low relief on a solid background, or cut out with a fretsaw, coping saw, jigsaw, or scroll saw. Most fretwork patterns are geometric in design. The materials most commonly used are wood and metal. Fretwork is used to adorn furniture and musical instruments. The term is also used for tracery on glazed windows and doors. Fretwork is also used to adorn/decorate architecture, where specific elements of decor are named according to their use such as eave bracket, gable fretwork or baluster fretwork, which may be of metal, especially cast iron or aluminum. Installing elaborate wooden fretwork on residential buildings, known as gingerbread trims, became popular in North America in the late 19th century.

Fretwork patterns originally were ornamental designs used to decorate objects with a grid or a lattice. Designs have developed from the rectangular wave Greek fret to intricate intertwined patterns. A common misconception is that fretwork must be done with a fretsaw. However, a fretwork pattern is considered a fretwork regardless of whether it was cut out with a fretsaw.

Computer numerical control has brought about change in the method of timber fretwork manufacture. Lasers or router/milling cutting implements can now fashion timber and various other materials into flat and 3D decorative items.

Fretwork is often used in squeezebox-type instruments to allow air to pass in and out of the instrument while preventing foreign objects getting inside the instrument.

== Gallery ==
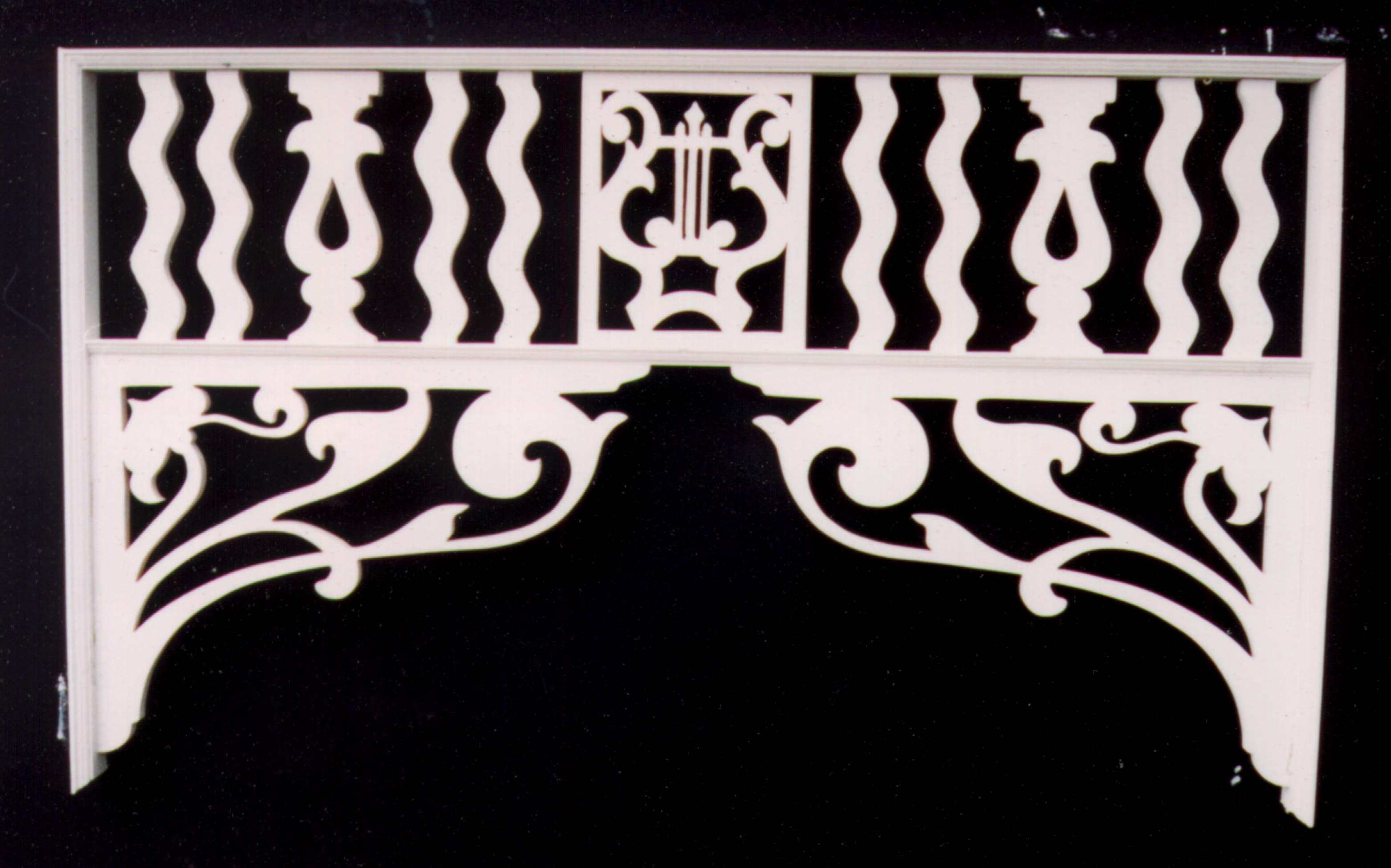
Timber fretwork

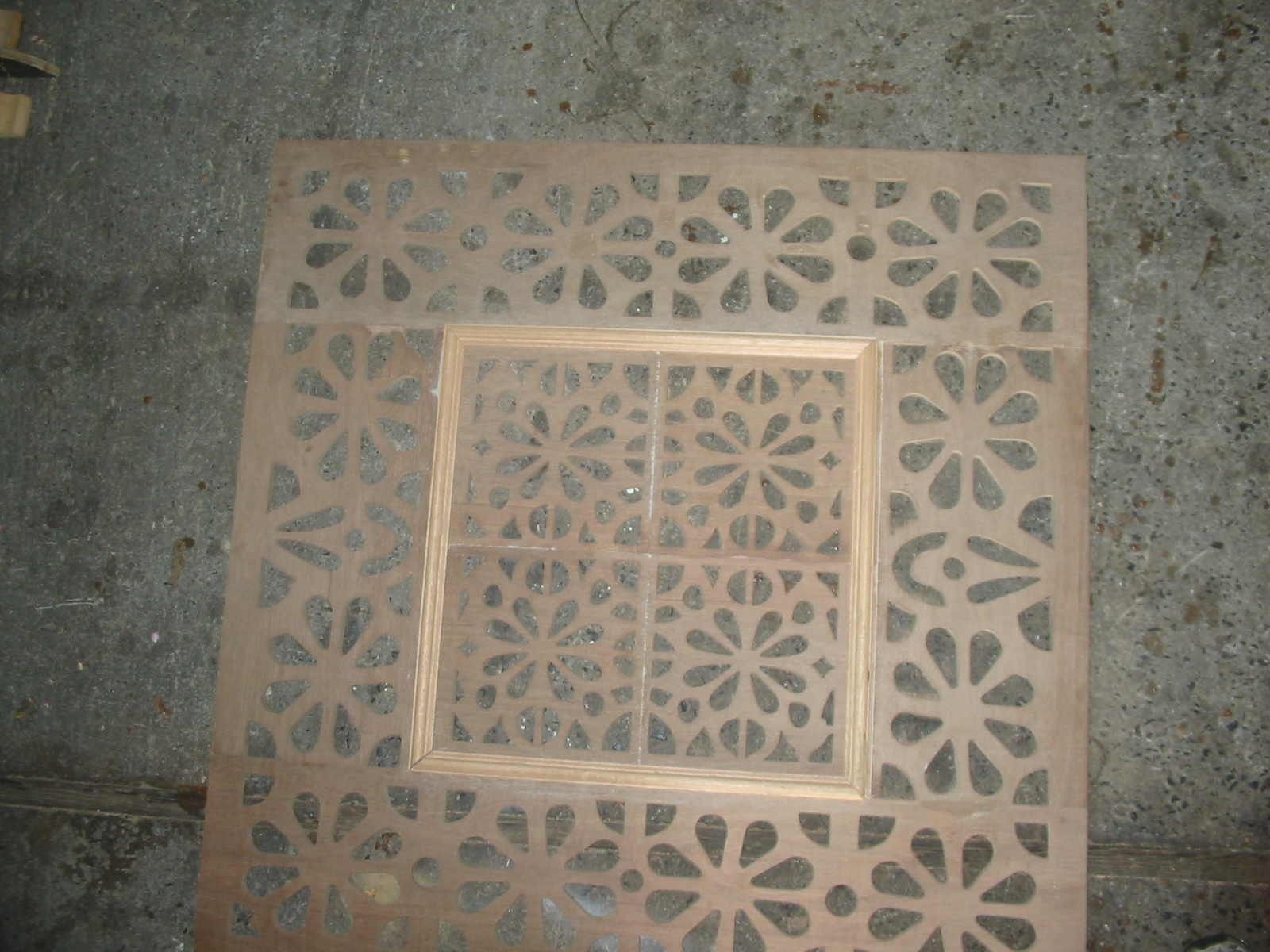
Fretwork for a ventilation or light grill

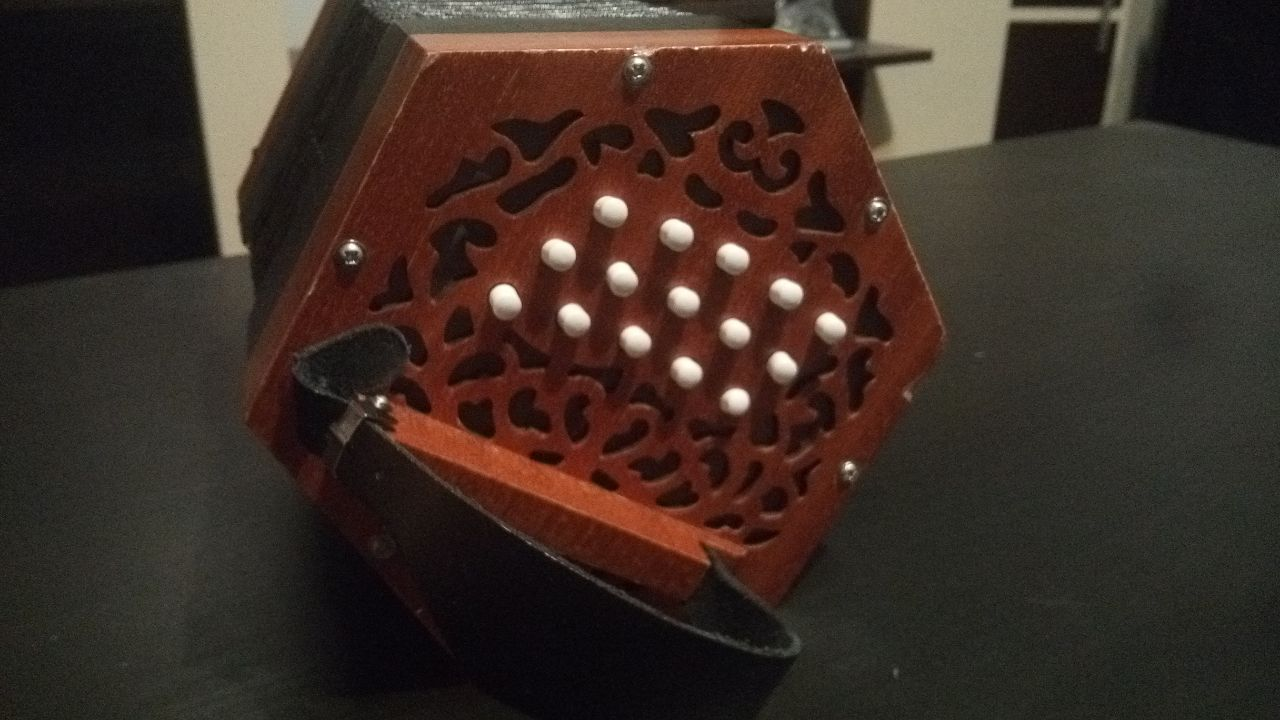
Fretwork of an Anglo concertina

== See also ==
- Openwork – artistic decoration using holes in solid materials
- Latticework – ornamental criss-crossed framework
- Sukashibori – Japanese term for openwork
