= Hacksaw =

Metal saw

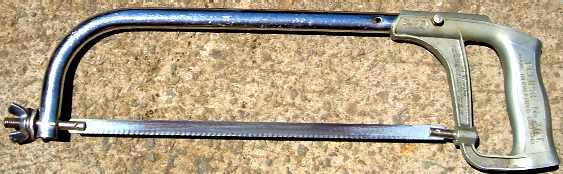
Typical full-size hacksaw frame, with 12" blade

A hacksaw is a fine-toothed saw, originally and mainly made for cutting metal. The equivalent saw for cutting wood is usually called a bow saw.

Most hacksaws are hand saws with a C-shaped walking frame that holds a blade under tension. Such hacksaws have a handle, usually a pistol grip, with pins for attaching a narrow disposable blade. The frames may also be adjustable to accommodate blades of different sizes. A screw or other mechanism is used to put the thin blade under tension.

On hacksaws, as with most frame saws, the blade can be mounted with the teeth facing toward or away from the handle, resulting in cutting action on either the push or pull stroke. In normal use, cutting vertically downwards with work held in a bench vise, hacksaw blades are set to be facing forwards.

== History ==
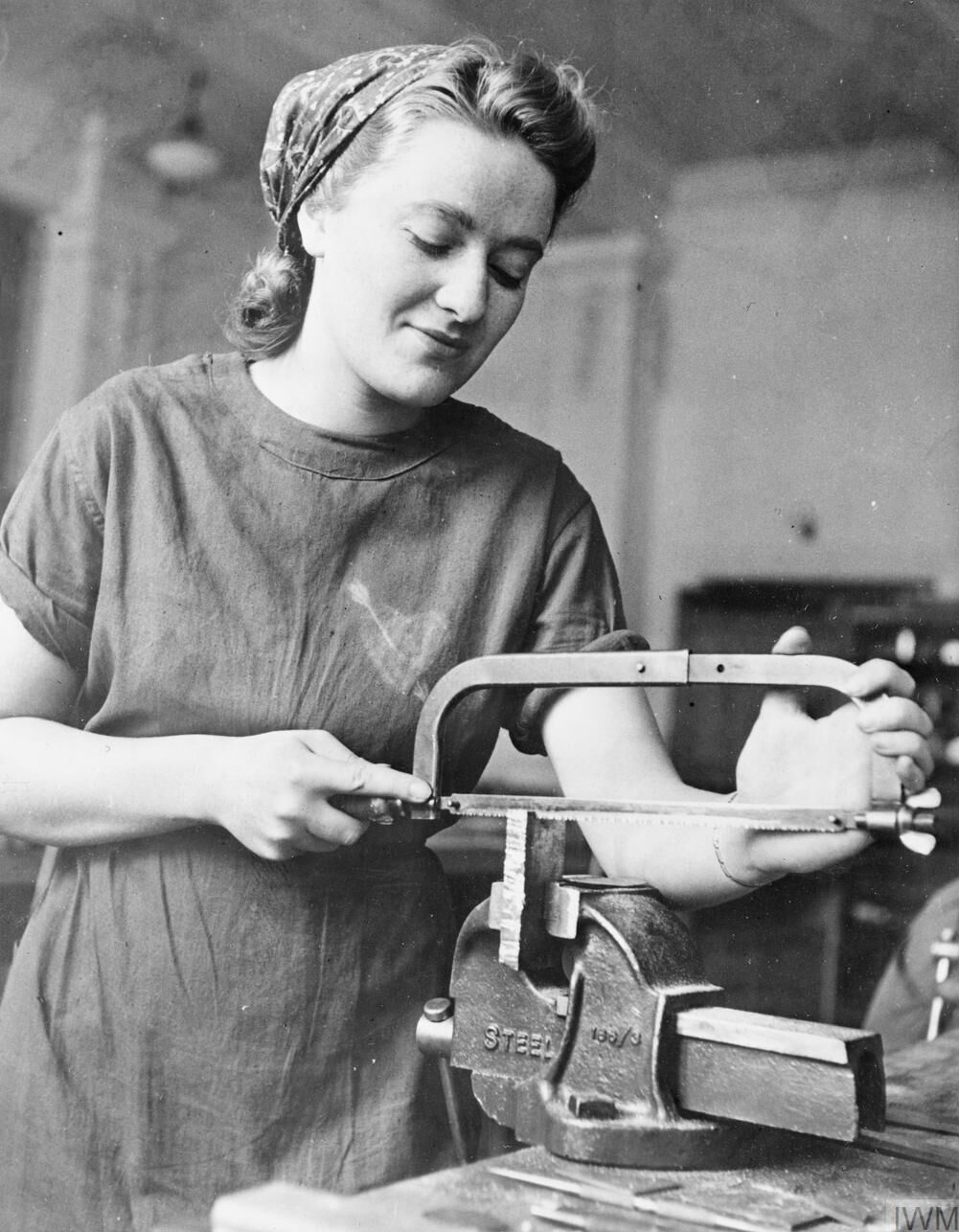
A woman using a hacksaw for vocational training during the Second World War

While saws for cutting metal had been in use for many years, significant improvements in longevity and efficiency were made in the 1880s by Max Flower-Nash. George N. Clemson, a founder of Clemson Bros. Inc of Middletown, New York, United States, conducted tests which involved changing the dimensions, shapes of teeth, styles of set, and variable heat treatments of blades. Clemson claimed enormous improvements to the cutting ability of blades and built a major industrial operation manufacturing hacksaw blades sold under the trade name Star Hack Saw. In 1898, Clemson was granted US Patent 601947, which details various improvements in the hacksaw.

== Design ==
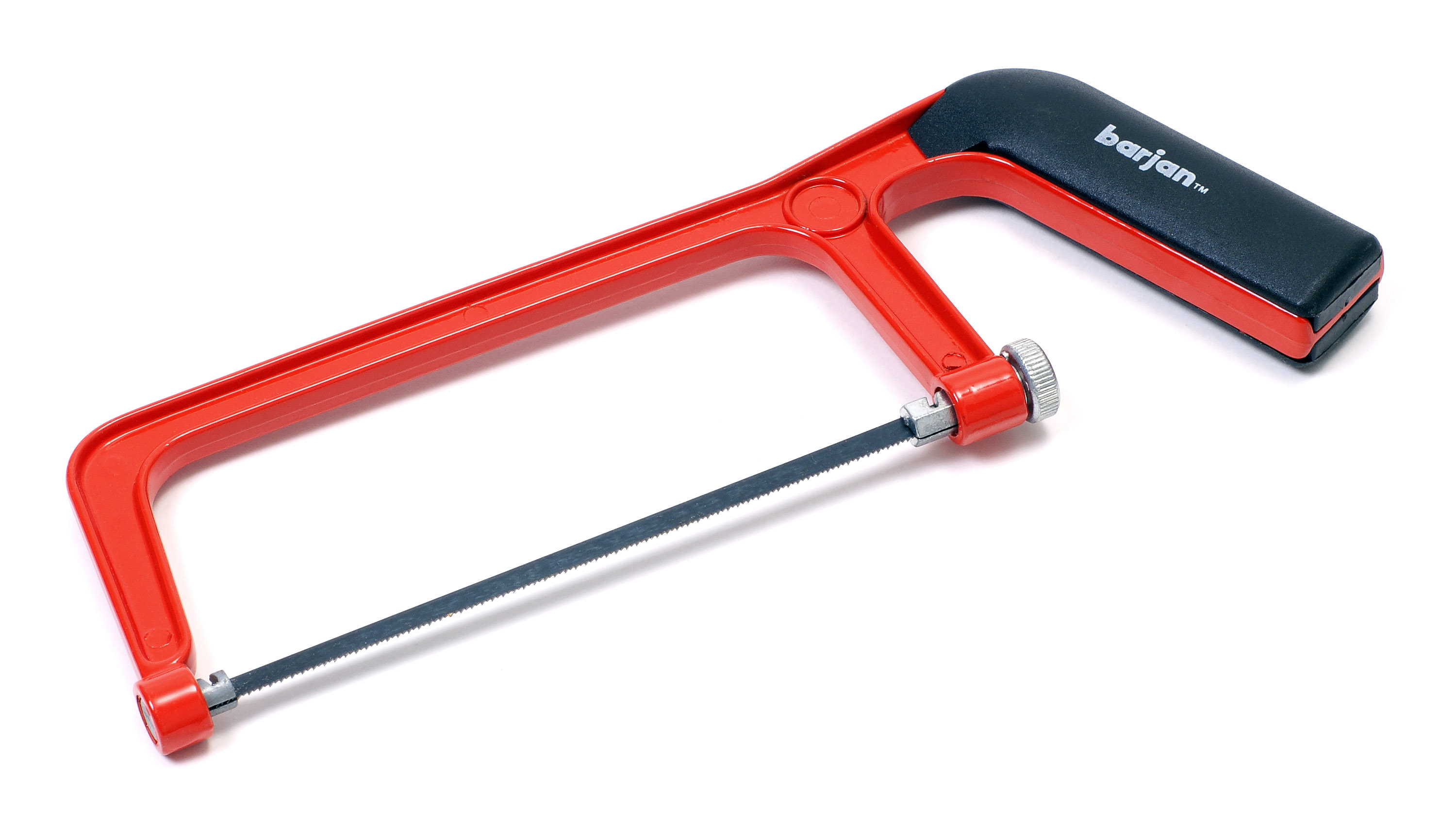
Small hacksaw (also known as junior hacksaw). The teeth of the hacksaw blade point forward, away from the handle.

Standard hacksaw blade lengths are 10 to 12 in (250 to 300 mm). Blades can be as small as 6 in (150 mm). Powered hacksaws may use large blades in a range of sizes, or small machines may use the same hand blades.

The pitch of the teeth can be from fourteen to thirty-two teeth per inch (TPI) for a hand blade, with as few as three TPI for a large power hacksaw blade. The blade chosen is based on the thickness of the material being cut, with a minimum of three teeth in the material. As hacksaw teeth are so small, they are set in a "wave" set. As for other saws they are set from side to side to provide a kerf or clearance when sawing, but the set of a hacksaw changes gradually from tooth to tooth in a smooth curve, rather than alternate teeth set left and right.

Hacksaw blades are normally quite brittle, so care needs to be taken to prevent brittle fracture of the blade. Early blades were of carbon steel, now termed 'low alloy' blades, and were relatively soft and flexible. They avoided breakage, but also wore out rapidly. Except where cost is a particular concern, this type is now obsolete. 'Low alloy' blades are still the only type available for the Junior hacksaw, which limits the usefulness of this otherwise popular saw.

For several decades now, hacksaw blades have used high speed steel for their teeth, giving greatly improved cutting and tooth life. These blades were first available in the 'All-hard' form which cut accurately but were extremely brittle. This limited their practical use to benchwork on a workpiece that was firmly clamped in a vice. A softer form of high speed steel blade was also available, which wore well and resisted breakage, but was less stiff and so less accurate for precise sawing. Since the 1980s, bi-metal blades have been used to give the advantages of both forms, without risk of breakage. A strip of high speed steel along the tooth edge is electron beam welded to a softer spine. As the price of these has dropped to be comparable with the older blades, their use is now almost universal.

The most common blade is the 12 inch or 300 mm length. Hacksaw blades have a hole at each end for mounting them in the saw frame and the 12 inch / 300 mm dimension refers to the center to center distance between these mounting holes.

The kerf produced by the blades is somewhat wider than the blade thickness due to the set of the teeth. It commonly varies between 0.030 and 0.063 inches / 0.75 and 1.6 mm depending on the pitch and set of the teeth.

== Uses ==
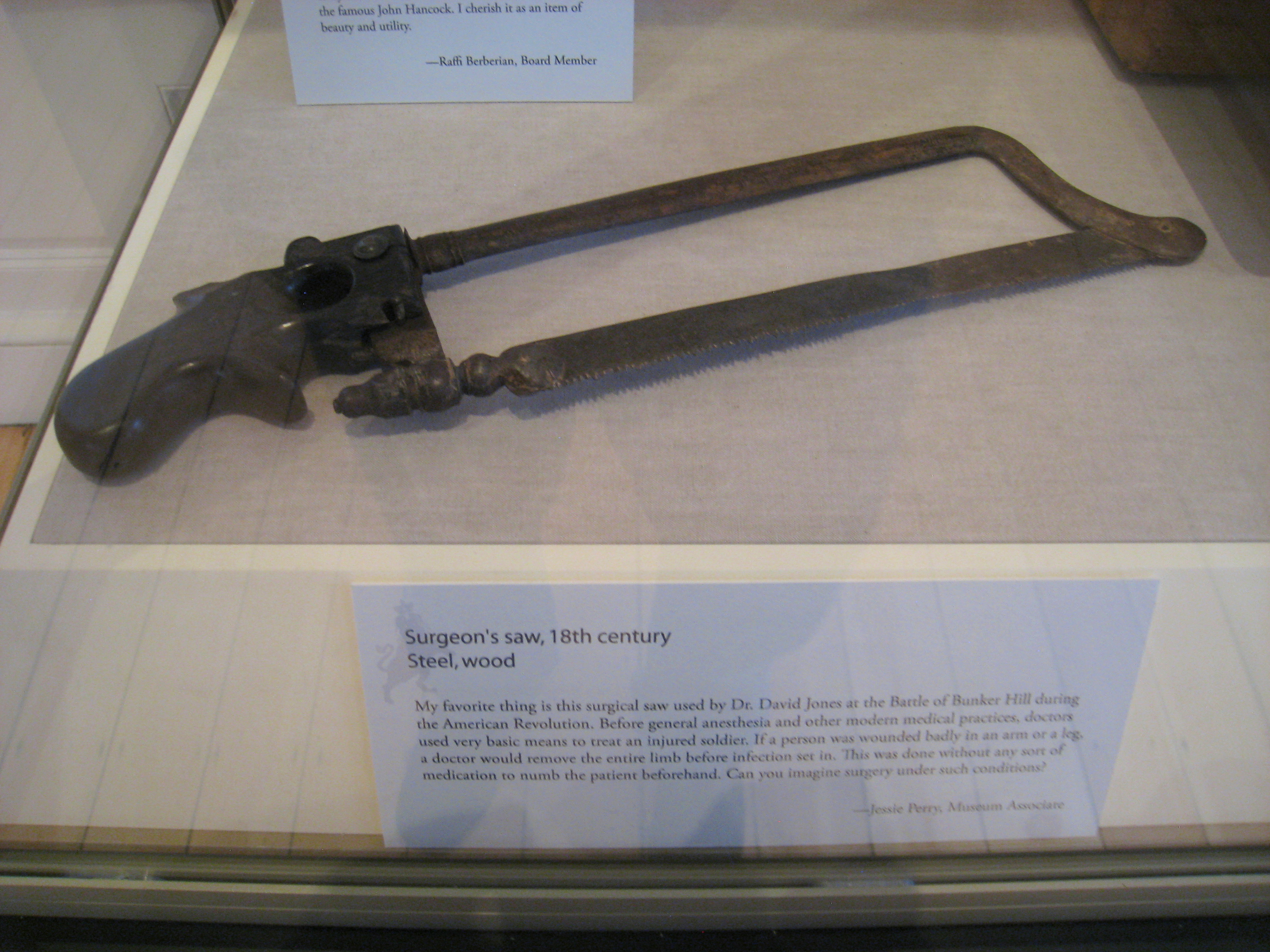
Surgeon's saw used at the Battle of Bunker Hill

Hacksaws were originally and principally made for cutting metal, but can also cut various other materials, such as plastic and wood; for example, plumbers and electricians often cut plastic pipe and plastic conduit with them, while surgeons can use unpowered saws as bonesaws.

== Variants ==
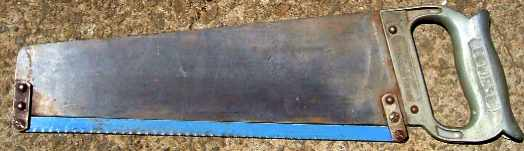
A panel hacksaw

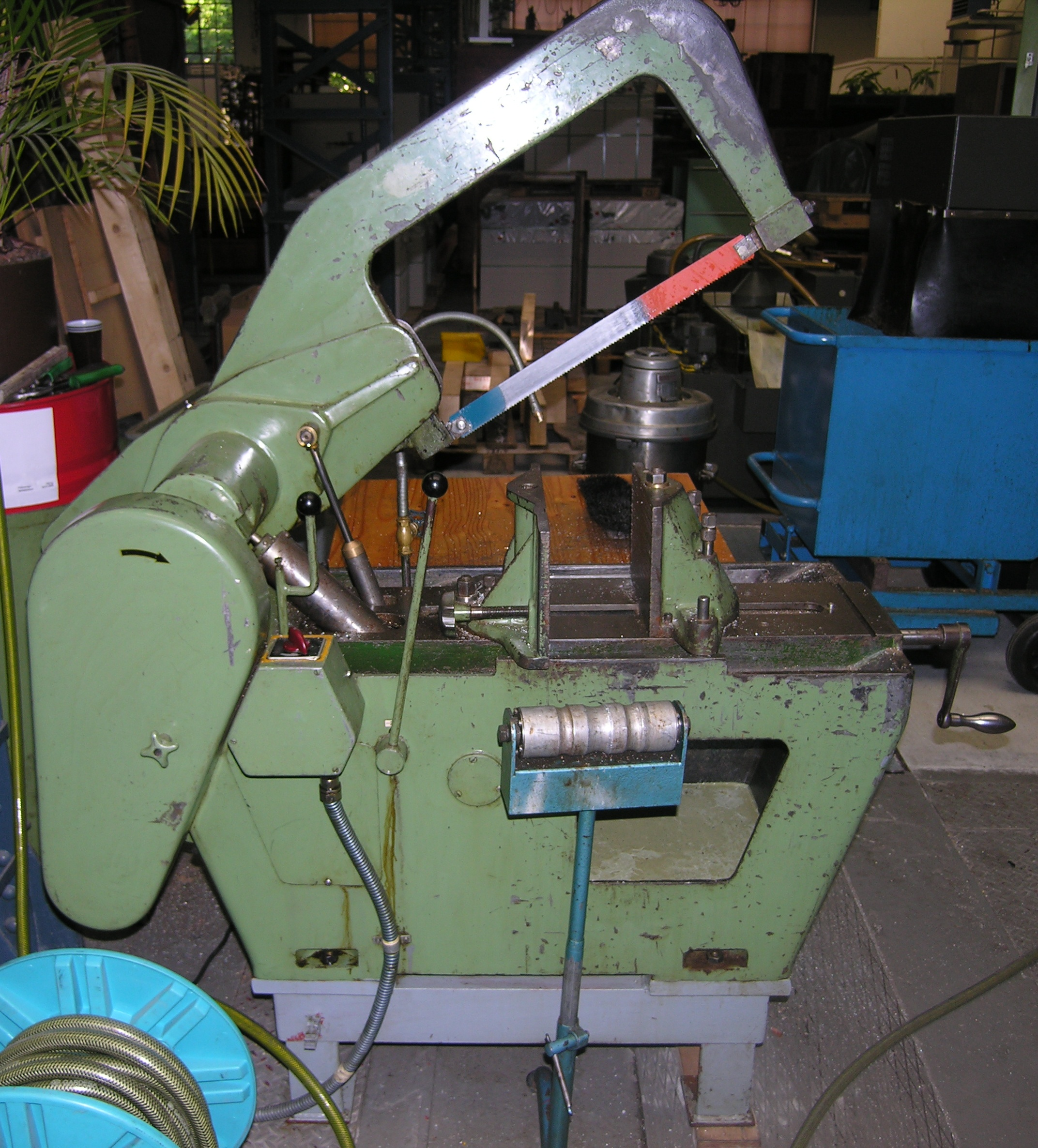
An electric hacksaw

A panel hacksaw has a frame made of a deep, thin sheet aligned behind the blade's kerf, so that the saw could cut into panels of sheet metal without the length of cut being restricted by the frame. The frame follows the blade down the kerf into the panel.

Junior hacksaws are a small version with a half-size blade. Like coping saws, the blade has pins that are held by notches in the frame. Although potentially a useful tool for a toolbox or in confined spaces, the quality of blades in the Junior size is restricted and they are only made in the simple low alloy steels, not HSS. This restricts their usefulness.

A power hacksaw (or electric hacksaw) is a type of hacksaw that is powered either by its own electric motor or connected to a stationary engine. Most power hacksaws are stationary machines but some portable models do exist; the latter (with frames) have been displaced to some extent by reciprocating saws such as the Sawzall, which accept blades with hacksaw teeth. Stationary models usually have a mechanism to lift up the saw blade on the return stroke and some have a coolant pump to prevent the saw blade from overheating.

Power hacksaws are not as commonly used in the metalworking industries as they once were. Bandsaws and cold saws have mostly displaced them. While stationary electric hacksaws are not very common, they are still produced. Power hacksaws of the type powered by stationary engines and line shafts, like other line-shaft-powered machines, are now rare; museums and antique-tool hobbyists still preserve a few of them.

== See also ==
- Coping saw
- Fretsaw
- Piercing saw
