= Crosscut saw =

Type of saw optimized for cutting across wood fibres

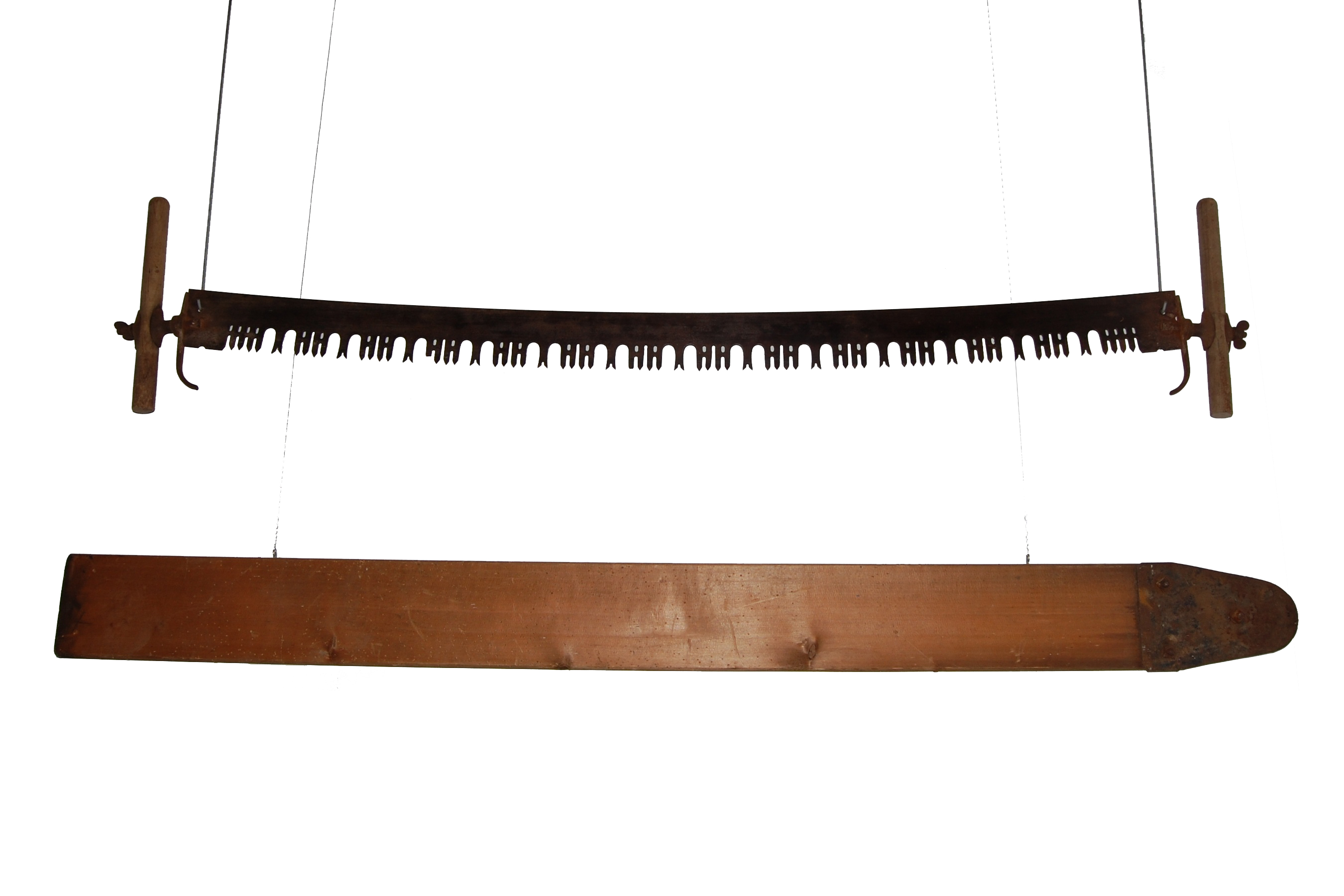
Two-man felling saw and springboard

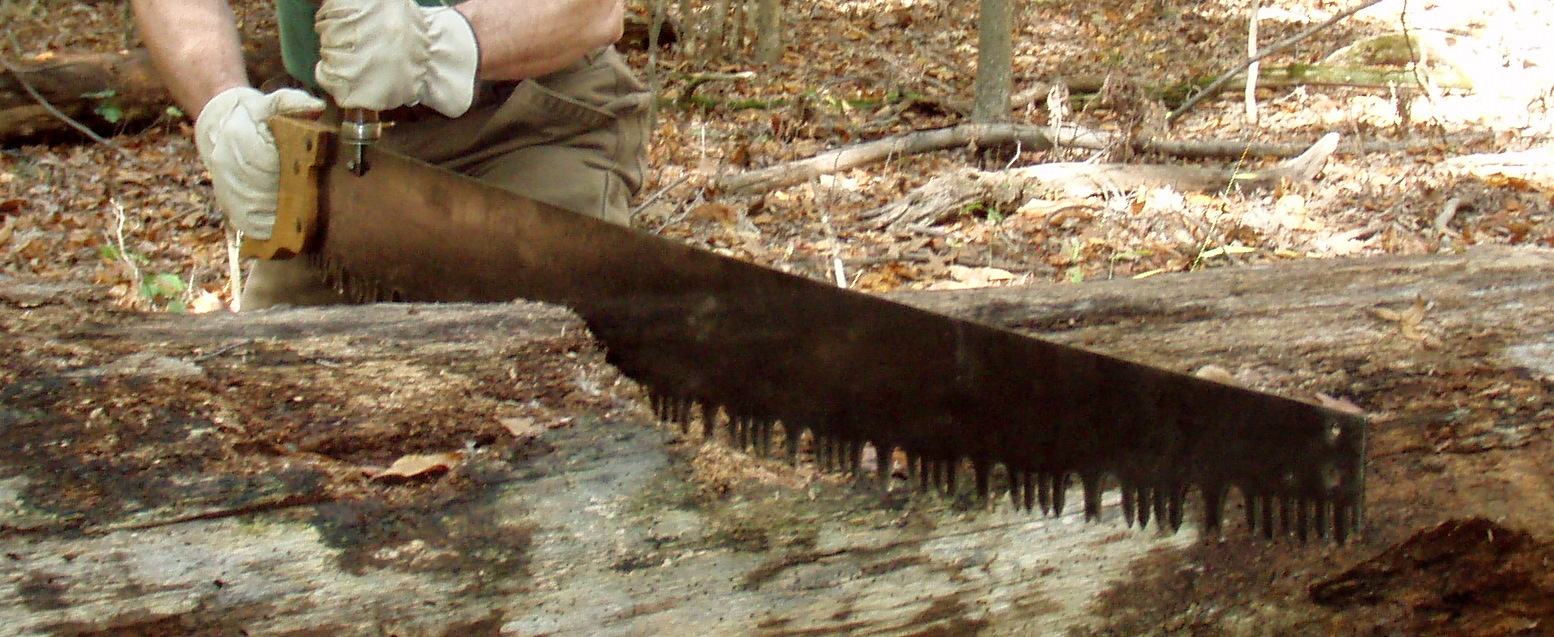
A five-foot lance-tooth crosscut saw

A crosscut saw (thwart saw) is any saw designed for cutting wood perpendicular to (across) the wood grain. Crosscut saws may be small or large, with small teeth close together for fine work like woodworking or large for coarse work like log bucking, and can be a hand tool or power tool.

The cutting edge of each tooth is angled in an alternating pattern. This design allows each tooth to act like a knife edge and slice through the wood in contrast to a rip saw, which tears along the grain, acting like a miniature chisel. Some crosscut saws use special teeth, called rakers, designed to clean out the cut strips of wood from the kerf. Crosscut saws generally have smaller teeth than rip saws.

Some saws, such as Japanese saws and those used by the ancient Egyptians, are designed to cut only on the pull stroke. Western saws, on the other hand, are designed to cut on the push stroke. Cross cut saws designed for log bucking and tree felling are designed to cut on the pull stroke.

== Common features ==
Many crosscut saws have a wooden handle with the return edge at right angles to the un-toothed edge of the saw blade, allowing the saw to serve as a square for marking material to be cut at a right angle.

Larger saws used for forestry and logging work include both one-man and two-man saws, and both bucking and felling saws. A bucking saw generally has a straighter back and less of a pronounced curve on its cutting surface. Since bucking saws are more often used on trees that are already downed, the greater stiffness and weight aids swift cutting, and allows two-man saws to also be used by one person, pushing as well as pulling.

A felling saw is generally less stiff than a bucking saw and the backside, as well as the cutting side, is usually curved inward. Felling saws are more often used to cut down standing trees, so the thinner, lighter design is easier to use without gravity holding the blade against the cut. The concave back of the saw makes it easier to place wedges, preventing the kerf from closing on the saw.

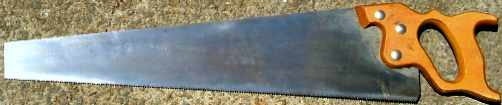
A crosscut saw of the type used for carpentry

Crosscut saws also include smaller hand saws used in carpentry.

== How crosscut saws cut ==
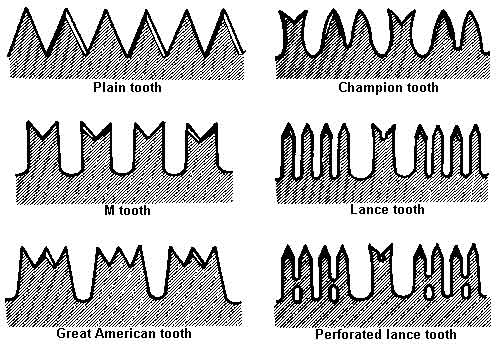
Common tooth patterns found on crosscut saws.

All saws have cutting teeth, some may also have rakers and gullets.

As the saw is pulled toward the operator, the cutters score the wood to the left and right of the width of the blade, cutting a channel downward into the wood. Many sawtooth patterns have four cutters; each cutter that cuts to the left of the blade is paired with another that cuts to the right of the blade.

Adjacent to the cutters there is generally a raker. The void on either side of the raker is known as the gullet. A raker is what does the actual removal of the wood that is being cut. The raker follows the cutters, paring the bottom of the kerf like a chisel or plane. As the raker pares the bottom of the kerf, a strip of wood is lifted upward, and curled forward into the gullet.

As the saw is drawn out of the kerf, the wood that has accumulated in the gullets is allowed to fall out onto the ground. A way to determine whether a saw is working well is to examine the noodle shaped strings of wood that are scraped out of the kerf; the presence of fairly long strings indicate that the side cutters are doing their job and that the raker is slicing out the wood cleanly.

The cutting mechanics of the crosscut saw tooth has been described as a ‘knife like’ cutting action. The sharp bevelled cutting edges sever the wood fibers perpendicular to the grain, reducing the amount of bending within the work-piece.

== Crosscut saws versus chainsaws ==
Felling or bucking is an inherently dangerous job. On top of that, both chainsaw and crosscut saws are dangerous in their own rights.

A kit for crosscut saw work weighs much less than a kit for chainsaw work. A chainsaw kit includes fuel, oil, a few tools, and more personal protective equipment.

The primary maintenance carried out on crosscut saws is sharpening, which requires a shop and a highly skilled filer. The primary maintenance on chainsaws is engine tuning, chain tensioning, and chain filing or replacement, which can be done at the site of felling and bucking.

Crosscut saws are unable to bore cut, a technique that a chainsaw operator often uses. Crosscut saws require more space to operate. They also allow the sawyer to stand several feet farther away from the log, which is safer particularly when finishing cuts. Crosscut saw use does not require hearing protection, which makes communication between team members possible, and also allows the sawyer to listen to the noises made by the log as stresses change.

In the United States, crosscut saw usage is permitted on all federal lands, whereas chainsaw usage is not permitted in designated wilderness areas.

== History ==
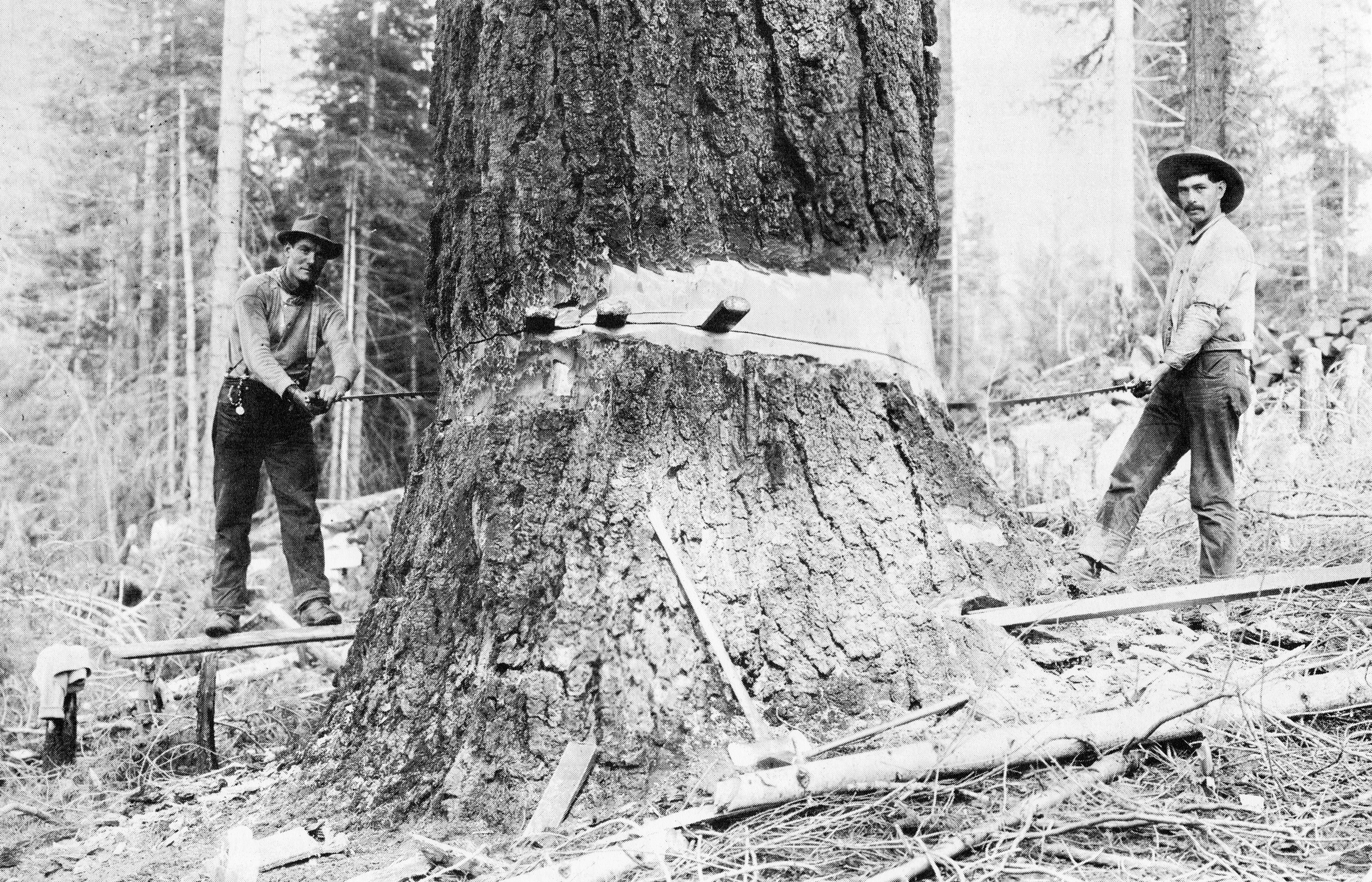
Two fellers use a crosscut saw to make an undercut in a large Sugar Pine around 1911. Wedges follow the saw to prevent binding. Coal oil provided lubrication. The feller at left stands on a springboard to maintain the saw's angle.

Crosscut saws have been in use around the world since historic times, with the design of the saws (the cutting surfaces, the bow and shape of the saw, and the handles) changing over time to accommodate differences in the types of trees being cut, changes in metallurgy technology, and the application of experience. Records exist of crosscut saws in use during the Roman Empire although not widely. They came into wide usage in Europe in the middle of the 15th century. Early saws had a plain tooth pattern until the M tooth pattern was developed in 15th century south Germany. Prior to about 1880 crosscut saws were primarily used for bucking, with axes used to fell trees. Starting in Pennsylvania about 1880, loggers began using the saws for felling trees as well. Despite the modern chainsaw, they are still in wide use around the world, not only in competition matches against chainsaws but also in regular, real-life usage since they afford certain advantages over gasoline-powered saws.

== Vintage saws versus modern saws ==
There are two types of crosscut saw classification, vintage and modern. Vintage saws are saws that can be anywhere from 30 to as much as 250 years old and are much sought after by professionals, and as such are typically very much more expensive than modern crosscut saws. Modern saws are typically stamped out of sheet metal and are manufactured from contemporary alloys; they behave very differently from vintage saws, which have historically been made by craftsmen who understood the nuances of the saws they produced.

In September 2005, the United States Forest Service conducted field trials of vintage saws against modern saws, details of which can be found in the external link reference provided below. One significant finding in the background research findings is that vintage saws are becoming increasingly difficult to locate owing to the demand for such saws by professionals.

Overall, modern saws have some advantages over vintage saws such as stiffness which is useful for felling but might cause difficulties when bucking downed trunks which have bind. Vintage saws which bend easily and can, in fact, be folded end-to-end for carrying on one's back, afford easier transport than most modern saws, and afford less-binding cuts that aren't straight.

== Crosscut saw training ==
San Gabriel Mountains Trailbuilder volunteers get safety training.

Many areas of the National Forests of the United States are designated as Wilderness Areas and as such the use of mechanized and motorized equipment is prohibited except by special circumstance. Because of this, the United States Forest Service (USFS) organizes the crosscut saw training of USFS employees and forest working volunteers in an effort to maintain skills and proficiency among those who need to use such saws.

Training within the Angeles National Forest concentrates greatly upon the safety of the USFS employees and forest volunteers, the safety of animals in the area, and the safety of the surrounding environment.

Training also includes an examination of the differences and benefits of vintage saws and modern saws created with modern materials. Vintage saws are those saws which were manufactured over fifty years ago, being made of high carbon steel instead of the exotic alloys which are typical of contemporary saws.

Crosscut saws are used with a variety of other small hand tools. Wedges are usually used to keep the sections of the log being cut in place as the saw is worked through the rest of the log. Wedges are placed to keep the sections apart but tie wedges may also be applied across the cut to hold sections together until the sawyer is ready for the sections to roll or drop out of the way.

Also covered in typical training sessions is the safe use of the common axe. To keep the saw sharp and to avoid cutting through rocks and dirt, the bark of the tree around the area to be cut is often removed with an axe.

Crosscut saw training is mostly safety training with the mechanics of working safely with top bind, bottom bind, and radial (twisting) bind comprising much of the training required to work with such saws. The establishment of escape routes for both felling and bucking may require that both operators at either end of a double-handled saw be constantly aware of the environment around them, and constantly aware of other people within the immediate region which might enter into the sphere of crosscut influence.

Traditionally over the past 250 years the use of crosscut saws in the many forests of the United States lacked the use of safety clothing and equipment. However, safety training in contemporary usage in the United States dictates the mandatory use of gloves, eye protectors, chainsaw boots with hard tops and high-top ankle protectors, Kevlar chaps, and long sleeved shirts.

Crosscut saws are used within Designated Wildernesses where chainsaws are banned due to the prohibited use of motorized or mechanized tools and equipment, requiring that crosscut training also include the proper use of non-petroleum based lubricants as well as training in techniques which leave a minimal impact both ecologically as well as visually after trails are cleared of downed trees.

Safe and effective crosscut and chainsaw use on federally administered public lands within the United States has been codified since July 19, 2016 in the publication of the Final Directive for National Saw Program issued by the United States Forest Service, USDA which specifies the training, testing, and certification process for employees as well as for unpaid volunteers who operate chainsaws within public lands.

The new directive specifies Forest Service Manual (FSM) 2358 (PDF) which covers classification of sawyers, their Personal Protective Equipment (PPE) and numerous other aspects of required safety training and behavior when operating chainsaws or crosscut saws on federally administered public lands.

== See also ==
- Bucksaw
- Hand saw
- Saw pit
- Two-man saw
- Underbucking
