= Compass (architecture) =

Curved circular form

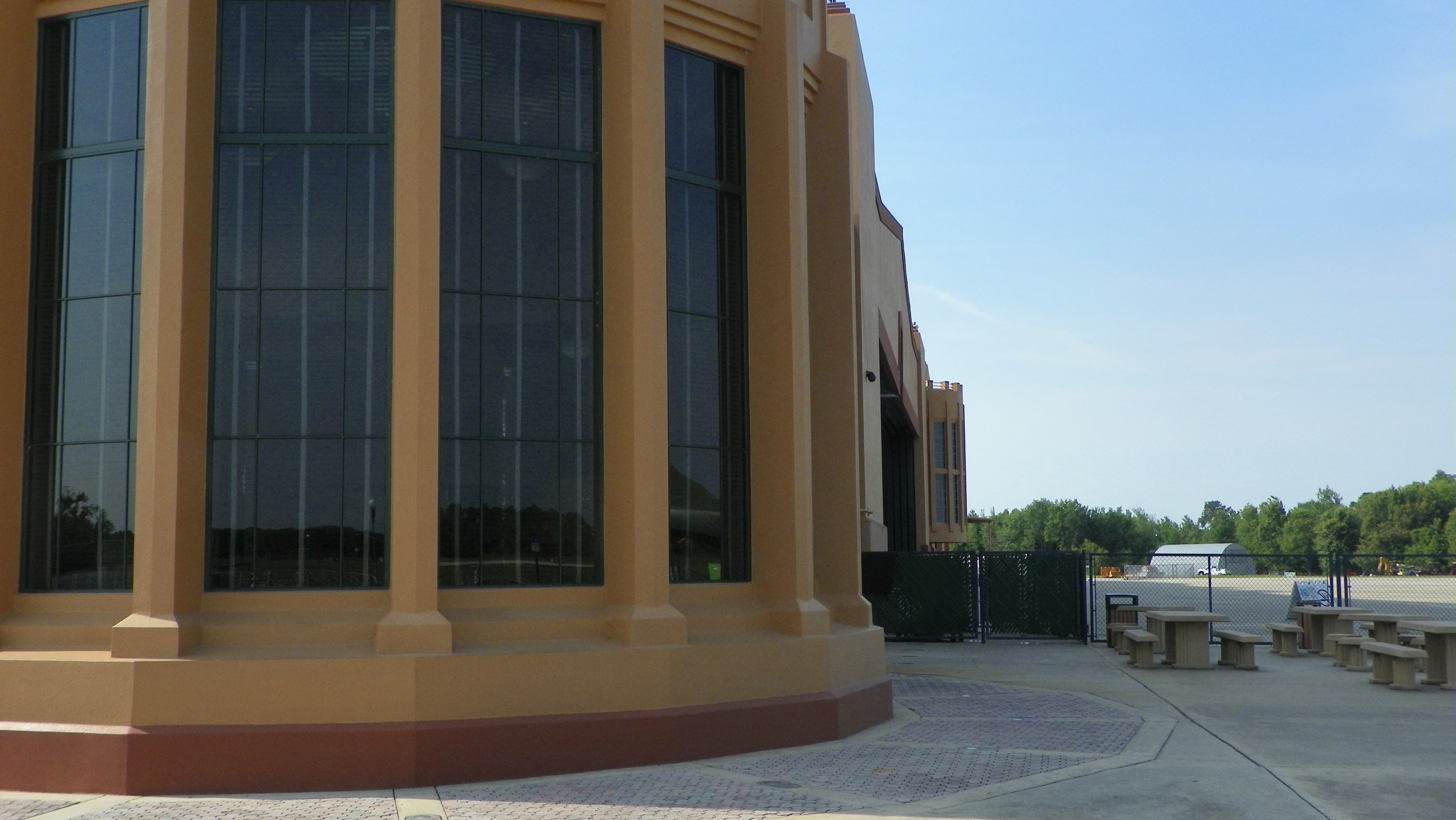
A compass window

In carpentry, architecture, and shipbuilding, a compass is a curved circular form.

== Examples ==
- A compass plane is a plane that is convex, length-ways, on the underside, for smoothing the concave faces of curved woodwork.
- A compass saw is a narrow-bladed saw that cuts a curve.
- A compass timber is a curved (or crooked) timber, sometimes used in shipbuilding.
- A compass brick is a curved brick.
- A compass wall is a curved wall.
- A compass window is a circular bay window.
- A surveyor's compass (or circumferentor) is a measuring instrument used in surveying horizontal angles.
