= Keyhole saw =

Type of saw

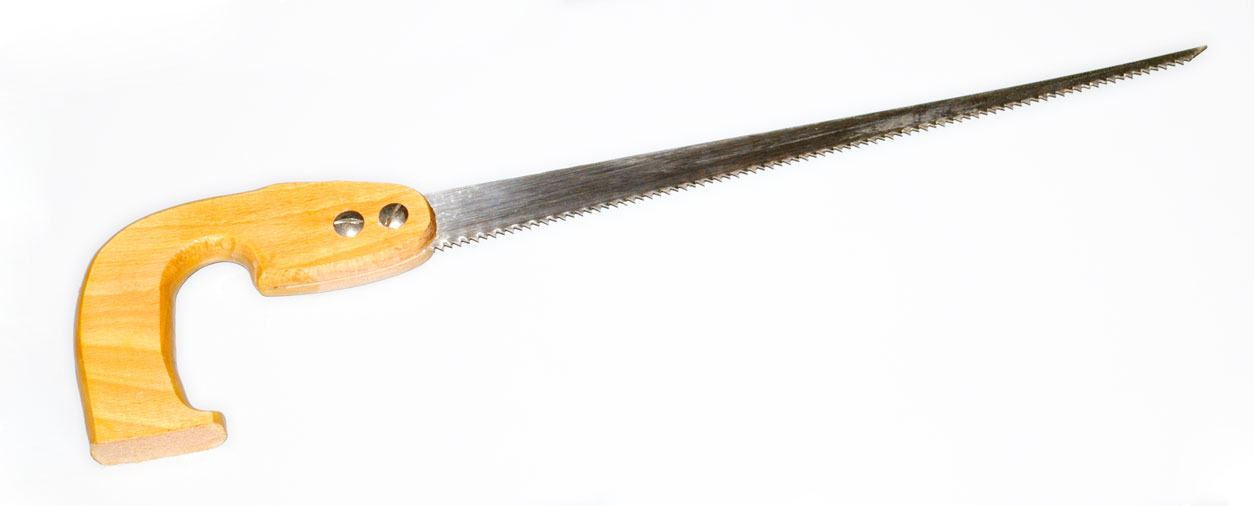
A keyhole saw with a wooden handle

A keyhole saw (also called a pad saw, alligator saw, jab saw or drywall saw) is a long, narrow saw used for cutting small, often awkward features in various building materials. There are typically two varieties of keyhole saw: the fixed blade type and the retractable blade type.

The retractable-blade variety is usually found to have either a cast-iron handle or, less commonly, a wooden handle. The facility to retract the blade to an optimum length serves to prevent unwanted flex to the blade should the full length of the blade be obstructed in some way. In both types, the blade is typically secured by one or two holding/thumb screws.

The cheaper, fixed-blade type is more commonly used in the modern construction trade. With the advance of certain building methods and materials, designs specific to these trades have been developed. One such modification being a sharpened point at the tip of the blade which can be pushed or jabbed through soft materials such as drywall without drilling a hole for the blade.

Compass saws typically feature a larger, coarser blade, and are designed to cut through tougher materials.

Two power tools serving largely the same function but which work more quickly and with less effort are the jigsaw and spiral saw.
