= Scroll saw =

Small electric or pedal-operated saw

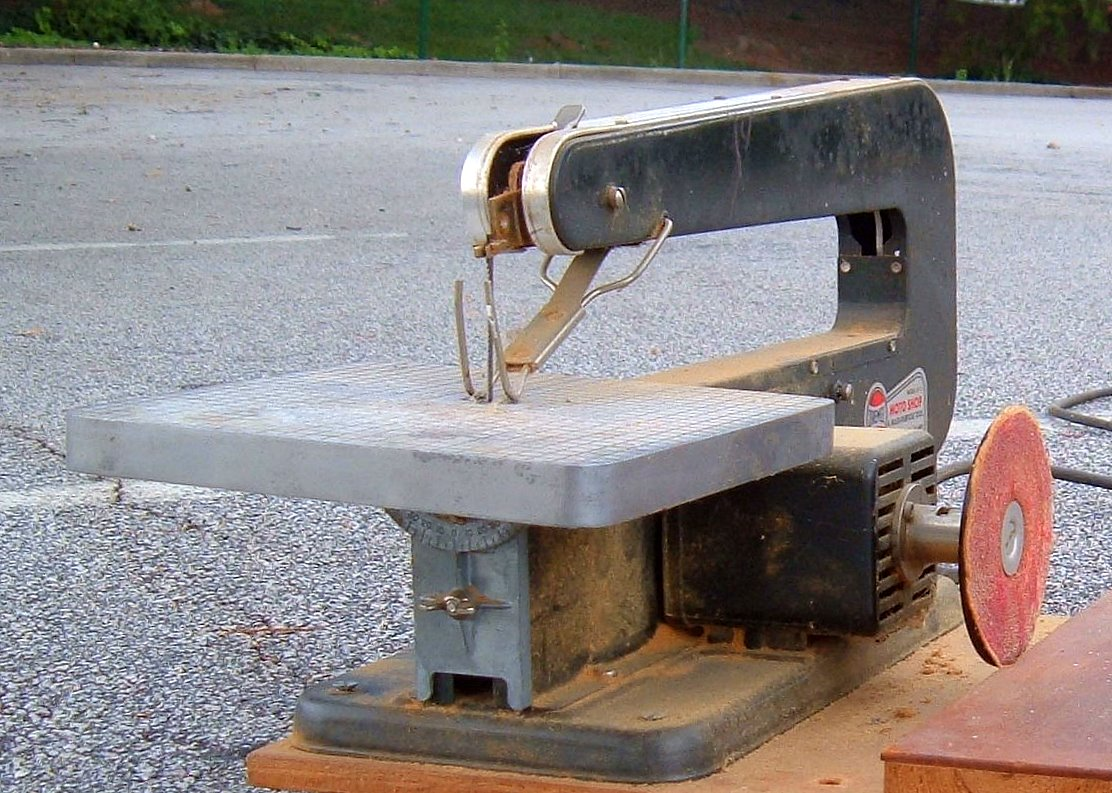
Dremel scroll saw

A scroll saw is a small electric or pedal-operated saw used to cut intricate curves in wood, metal, or other materials. The fineness of its blade allows it to cut more delicately than a power jigsaw, and more easily than a hand coping saw or fretsaw. Like those tools, it is capable of creating curved cuts with angled edges, by tilting the body of the saw or its table along the axis of the cut.

== Advantages ==
While somewhat similar to a band saw, a scroll saw uses a reciprocating blade rather than a continuous loop. Like a hand coping saw, the scroll saw's blade can be removed and placed through a pre-drilled starting hole, allowing interior cutouts to be made without an entry slot. Also, the fineness in both width and tooth count of a scroll's blade permits significantly more intricate curves than even the narrowest gauge band-saw blade.

The majority of scroll saws offer a small light on a flexible arm that illuminates the work area and a dust blower nozzle to keep the work space clear while working. Table-tilting enables angled cuts to be made precisely and easily. Variable-speed support allows even finer control over cuts when working with delicate materials or when making intricate cuts.

== Types ==
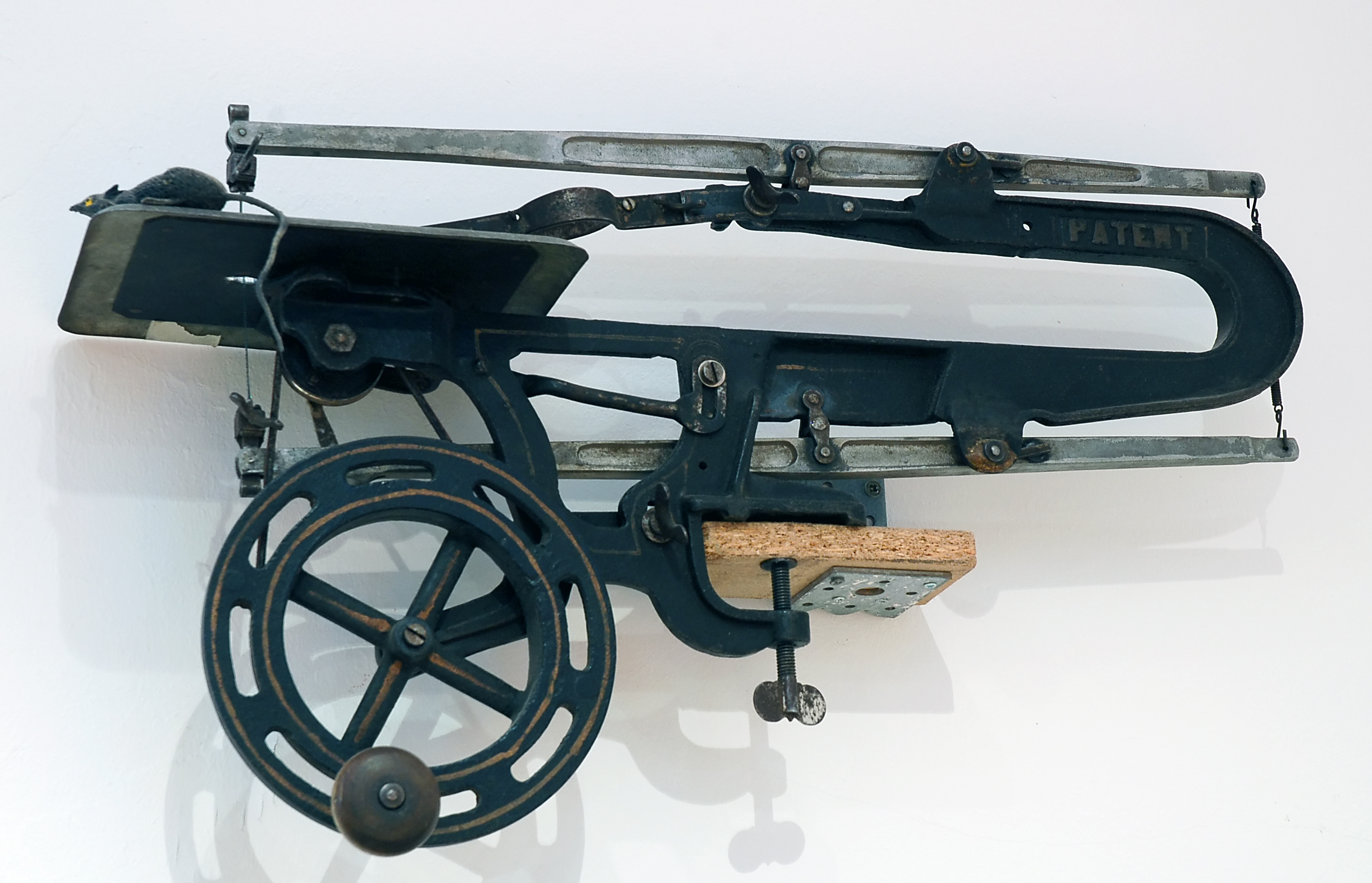
Hand-operated scroll saw, around 1900

A scroll saw is classified according to the size of its throat, which is the distance from the blade to the rear frame of the saw. The throat depth determines how large a piece of wood can be cut. Smaller saws have a throat of as little as 12 inches (300 mm), while commercial saws can approach 30 inches (760 mm). Before the era of computer automation, industrial saws were sometimes used to make even larger objects by hanging the top mechanical linkage from the ceiling, thus providing an arbitrarily deep throat.

Scroll saws vary in price. The more costly saws are more accurate and easier to use, usually because they minimize vibration, though this is dependent in part upon design and frequency, with many models offering no vibrations in some frequencies, and increased vibration in others.

== Uses ==
Scroll sawing is a popular hobby for many woodworkers. The tool allows a substantial amount of creativity and requires comparatively little space. In addition, many scroll saw projects require little more than the saw itself, reducing the investment in tools. A drill is required for interior cutouts, preferably a drill press for finely detailed work.

Scroll saws are often used to cut intricate curves and joints, a task they can complete quickly and with great accuracy. They can also be used to cut dovetail joints and are a common tool for thicker intarsia projects. When a fine blade is used, the kerf of a scroll saw is almost invisible.

Along with band saws, jigsaws, and now recently seen chainsaws, scroll saws are used with modern intarsia.

Scroll saws are comparatively safe. In particular, inadvertent contact between the blade and the operator's fingers or limbs is unlikely to result in serious injury, due to a smaller blade and relatively slower speed compared to tools such as a table saw.

== Mode of operation ==
There are several types of scroll saws. The most common design is the parallel arm, in which a motor is attached near the back of the arms and the two arms always remain parallel to each other. The C-arm variant uses a solid C-shaped arm, with the blade being mounted between the two ends of the "C". The parallel link type, used by Hawk, Excalibur, and DeWalt, has rods in the upper and lower arms that are "pushed" by the motor to move short (about 4 inches, or 100 millimetres) articulated arms which hold the blade.

The rigid arm scroll saw was popular until the 1970s but is no longer made. It has a single-piece cast iron frame. The blade is attached to a pitman arm on the bottom, which pulls the blade down. A spring in the upper arm pulls the blade back up again. This design has a significant weakness in that the tension on the blade changes with every stroke; modern scroll saws are all "constant tension" designs.

== Blades ==
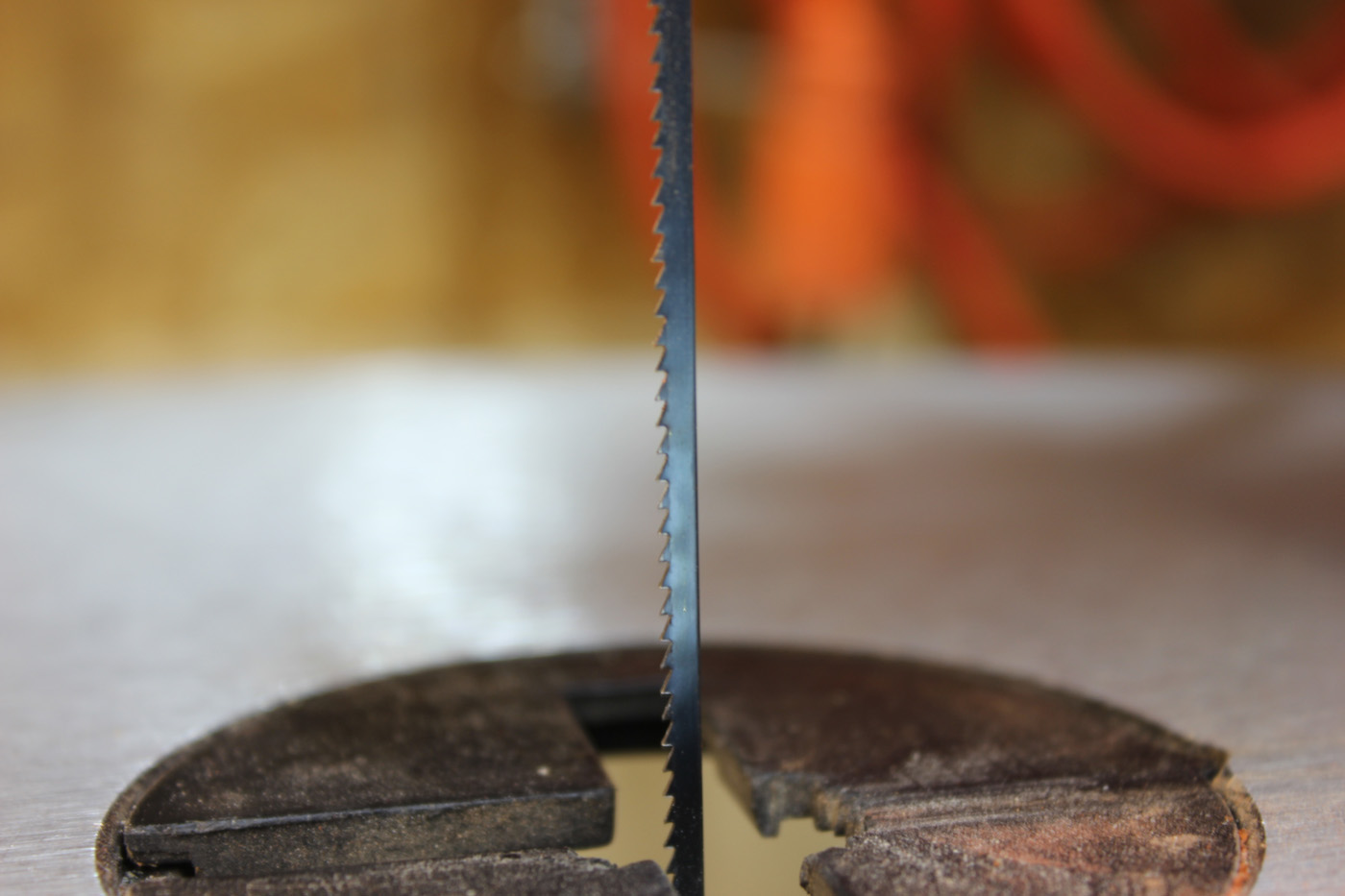
Scroll saw blade

With the exception of blades made for very light duty saws, typical scroll saw blades are 130 mm (5 in) long. The major types are:

- Skip tooth (or single skip tooth) which have a tooth, a gap, and then another tooth;
- Double skip tooth (two teeth, a gap, then two teeth);
- Crown or two-way, which have teeth facing both up and down so that the blade cuts on both the down-stroke (as with all other blades) and the up-stroke;
- Spiral blades, which are essentially regular flat blades with a twist, so that teeth project on all sides;
- Metal cutting blades made of hardened steel;
- Diamond blades (wires coated with diamond fragments), for cutting glass.
- Pin end blades are generally a bit thicker and are made to use on scroll saws that require pin end blades which are generally older, less expensive or made for entry level scrollers. Most newer higher-end scroll saws do not accept pin end blades.

Blades come in many weights, ranging from #10/0 (for making jewelry—about the size of a coarse hair) to #12, which is similar to a small band saw blade.

Another variation is called a reverse tooth blade. On reverse tooth blades, the bottom 19 mm (3/4 in) of the teeth are reversed (point up). This arrangement helps to reduce splintering on the bottom edges of the cut. However, it does not clear sawdust out of the cut as well as a regular blade, so cutting is slower and produces more heat. This heat reduces blade life and makes scorching of the workpiece more likely. Reverse tooth blades are especially useful when cutting softwood and plywood such as Baltic birch.

The latest variation is called "ultra-reverse". These blades are configured with 4–5 teeth down and then one up, repeated through the length of the blade. The blade clears dust very well and leaves a much cleaner back (very few "fuzzies"). These blades' sizes range from #1 through #9.
