= Fretsaw =

Bow saw for intricate cutting

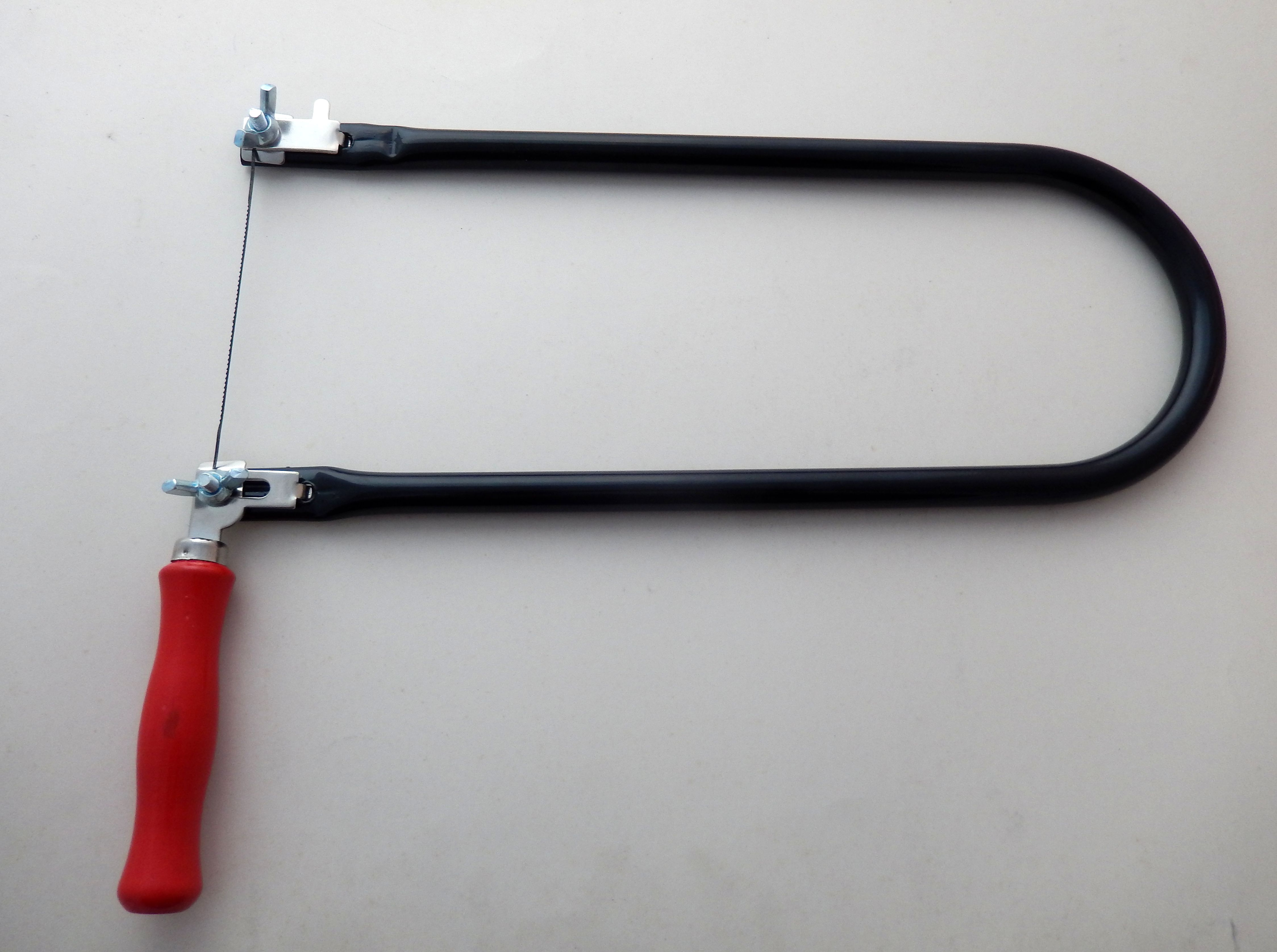
Fretsaw

The fretsaw is a bow saw used for intricate cutting work which often incorporates tight curves. The tool takes its name from its use in fretwork. Although traditionally intended for woodwork, different blades increase the versatility of this saw.

== Description ==
The fretsaw is a bow saw used for intricate cutting work which often incorporates tight curves. The tool takes its name from its use in fretwork and ultimately from the French freter (lattice)—a reference to the intricate patterns often created using this tool.

The fretsaw is similar in many respects to the scroll saw, which is essentially a powered fretsaw with a table. Blades between the two tools are usually interchangeable, and indeed scroll saws are often known as "fret saws" informally.

== Use ==
Although the coping saw is often used for similar work, the fretsaw is capable of much tighter radii and more delicate work. It has a distinctive appearance due to the depth of its frame (typically between 10 and 20 inches (25 and 51 cm)), which together with the relatively short five-inch (13 cm) blade makes this tool appear somewhat out of proportion compared with most other saws. Compared with the coping saw it has much shallower blades, which are usually extra-fine, up to 32 teeth per inch (13 teeth per centimetre). This allows much tighter curves to be cut—with many blades even sharp corners are possible—but the blades are also much more fragile compared with that of a coping saw. Unlike the coping saw, the blade has a fixed orientation in relation to the frame. This means that the fretsaw is less useful when cutting long narrow components, but the increased depth of the frame does allow access much further from the edge of the board.

Because of its sheer size, the frame makes up a large proportion of the total weight of the tool and has a relatively large moment, which in the hands of an inexperienced user can create a tendency for the direction of cut to drift away from that desired. To counter this the fretsaw is usually used with the handle (and blade) aligned on a vertical axis which reduces the effects of this torque. The effect may also be lessened with a shorter (and lighter) frame, although this also reduces the size of components that may be worked. A cutting or fretwork table, also known as a V-board, made of either wood or metal and which clamps to the edge of the workbench, may be used to support the work piece whilst allowing clearance for the saw blade by means of a V-shaped slot cut into it.

The blade is usually clamped into position using a pair of wingnuts. Although wing nuts are usually intended for operation without tools it is often impossible to apply sufficient force purely by hand. Wingnut wrenches greatly increase the torque that may be applied, ensuring that the blade is securely clamped.

== Types of blade ==
Although traditionally intended for woodwork, metal cutting blades are readily available increasing the versatility of this saw. Spiral blades are also available which have teeth on all sides of the blade, and will cut in any direction without the need to rotate either the saw or the work piece. This can be useful when access is restricted due to the size of the component being worked, and compensate in part for the inability to rotate the blade in the manner possible with a coping saw. However, they also have a wider kerf and as such remove more material than a conventional blade. Also available are abrasive blades with no actual teeth, consisting of a wire coated with diamond, carbide, or other abrasive material.

These alternative blades make the fretsaw suitable for many tasks traditionally performed by the piercing saw, although piercing saw blades are typically finer still than the finest fretsaw blade.
