= Coping saw =

Type of bow saw

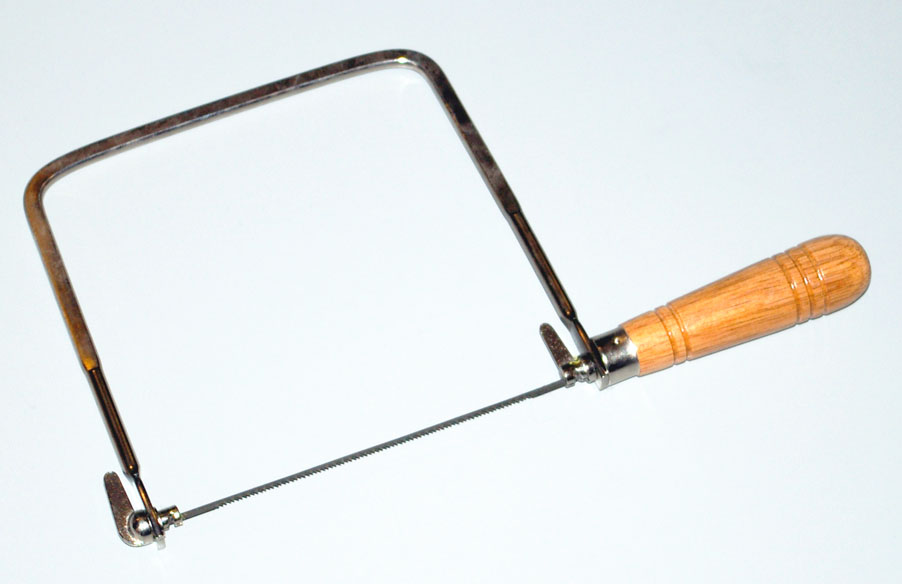
A coping saw.

A coping saw is a type of bow saw used to cut intricate external shapes and interior cut-outs in woodworking or carpentry. It is widely used to cut moldings to create coped rather than mitre joints. It is occasionally used to create fretwork though it is not able to match a fretsaw in intricacy of cut, particularly in thin materials. Coping saw blades are always thicker and much coarser cutting than typical fretsaw blades and many others of its family members. Coping saws can however cut slight bends in the work, allowing circles to be cut if used carefully.

== History ==
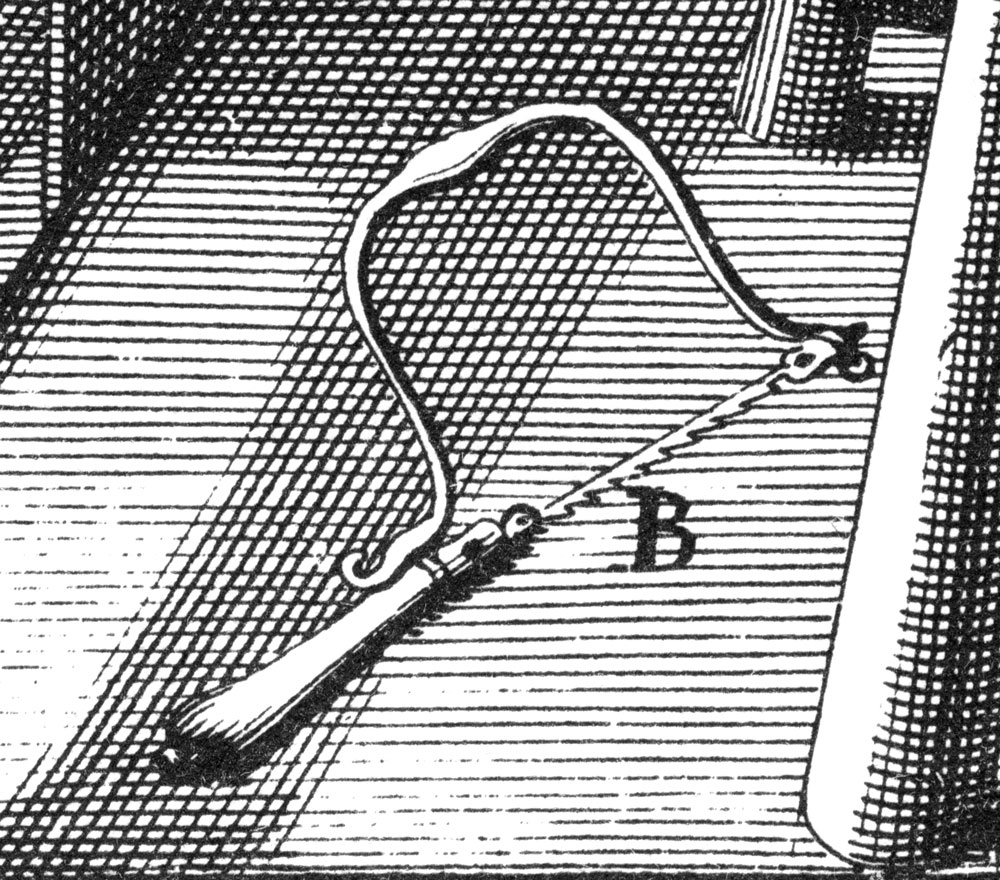
Detail of engraving from book, André Félibien, Des principes de l'architecture, de la sculpture, de la peinture, et des autres arts qui en dépendent, 1676, Planche LXIV, page 451, Fig. B showing possibly the oldest depiction of coping saw.

The coping saw was most likely invented in the middle of the 16th century following innovations in metallurgy and with the invention of the spring-driven clock. Blades made of this material were strong and flexible thanks to rolling. This saw was also used in combination with the so-called Chevalet de Marqueterie, invented in 1780, allowing to saw pack of veneers with one angle of cut.

== Construction ==
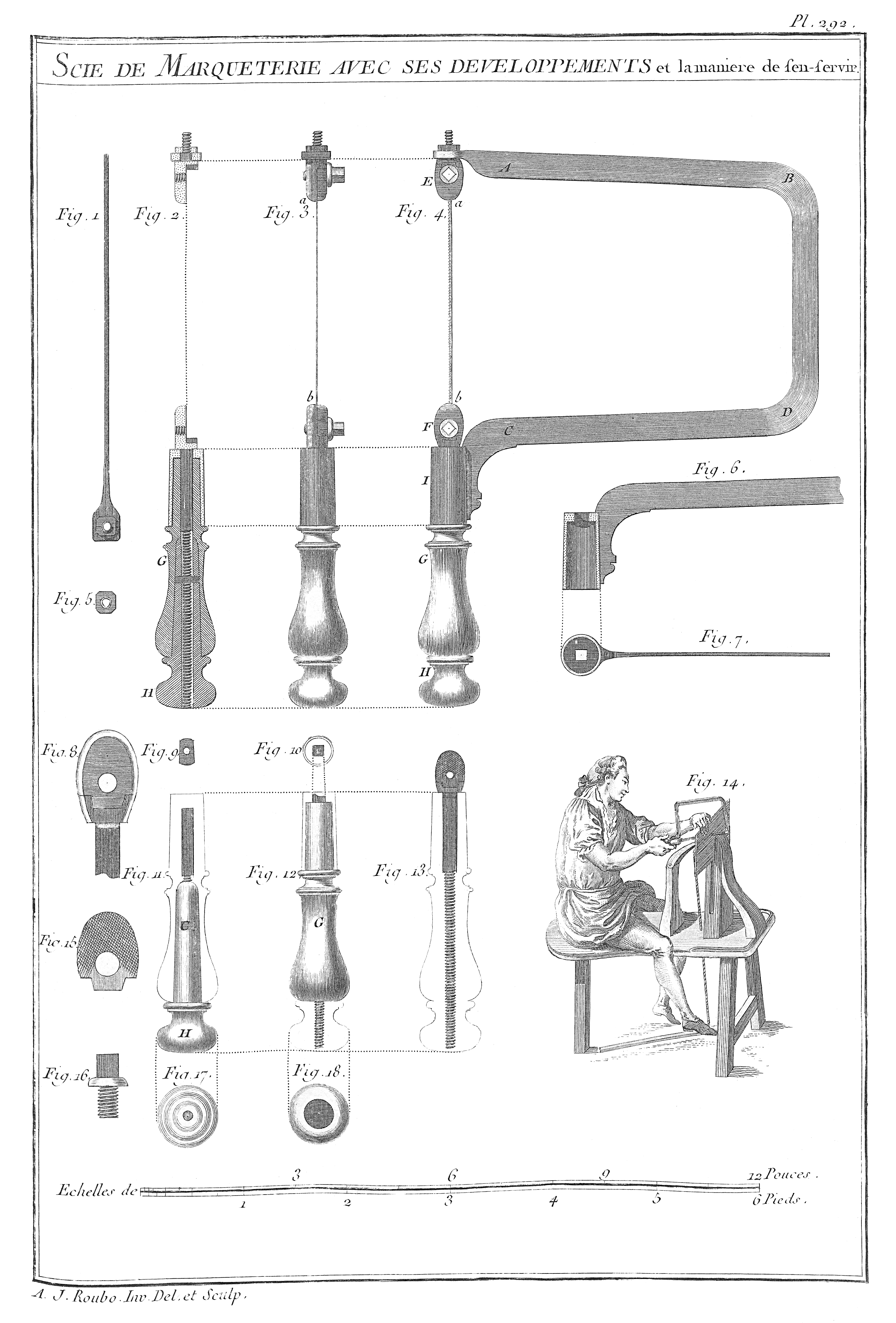
Engraving by André Jacob Roubo from encyclopaedia L'Art du Menuisier (1769) showing the construction of a coping saw (here: "marquetry saw") and its usage.

A coping saw consists of a thin, hardened steel blade, stretched between the ends of a square, c shaped, springy-iron frame to which a handle is attached. The blade is easily removed from the frame so that the blade can be passed through a drilled hole in the middle of a piece of wood. The frame is then re-attached to the blade and the cut starts from the middle of the piece. Long cuts perpendicular to the edge of the material are possible but the shallow depth of the frame rather limits how far from the edge one may cut. The much deeper frame of the fretsaw is more useful for cutting well away from the edge but conversely cannot manage the thicker materials commonly cut by the coping saws.

== Use ==
The coping saw blade is removable by partially unscrewing the handle and can be installed in the frame such that it cuts on either the push stroke (teeth pointing away from the handle) or pull stroke (straight teeth pointing towards the handle). The blade is prevented from rotating by means of the short steady bar provided where the blade is attached. Loosening the handle also allows the blade to be rotated relative to the frame as desired. Carefully aligning the finger with the steady bars at the top and bottom of the blade ensures that the thin blade is straight and not twisted along its length. Retightening the handle tensions the blade and locks it at the desired angle relative to the frame. The short steady bar nearest the handle is held securely between finger and thumb while the handle is tightened to ensure the blade remains at the desired angle. Unlike the fretsaw the coping saw blade has holding pins which lock securely into the angled slots of the rotatable blade holders.

The direction of the cut is quite easy to change because of the thinness of the blade. Gentle curves are achieved by slowly turning the whole frame by means of the handle while continuing to cut steadily. When necessary, the blade can also be rotated with respect to the frame to make sharper curves in the material being cut. Blade breakage is much rarer than with a fretsaw.

A coping saw (with the correct blade) can also be used to cut through aluminium tubing and other metal objects, though a hacksaw is much more efficient for this task. The thin blade tends to make wavy cuts in thick materials unless skill is achieved through much practice on a wide variety of materials of varying thicknesses. The stroke length before the frame strikes the material above or below is the limiting factor in the maximum thickness of material. The work becomes progressively more difficult and tiring with increasing thickness of material.

== See also ==
- Bow saw
- Fretsaw
- Hacksaw
- Jigsaw
- Piercing saw
- Scroll saw
