= Underbucking =

Axe handle being used to support an underbuck cut

Underbucking is a type of log bucking where the cuts are made upwards from the lower side of a suspended log. It is the opposite of overbucking, cutting from the top side down. The tool supporting a saw in such a cut is known as the "underbuck".

== Overview ==
Underbucking is called that because a sawyer will cut the suspended log from the underside of the log, upwards. Cutting from the top of a suspended log will cause the log to bind on the saw blade as the log sags at the cutting point. Cutting from below will cause the cut to widen as the log sags, avoiding binding on the saw chain.

=== Tool ===
An underbucking tool can be made using an ax driven into the side of the log so that a crosscut saw can be turned upside down.

A special tool designed specifically for underbucking facilitates the job of cutting from the ground upwards. The underbuck tool is driven into the section of the log which is considered to be least likely of moving once the cut has been successfully made. The crosscut saw's backside rides along the pulley that rests on the bar driven into the log. As the sawyer draws the saw backward, the sawyer may apply leverage downward and the pulley will redirect the force upward into the wood. Some underbuck cuts are made part way and finished with a cut from the top.

== Sources ==
- http://www.enotes.com/topic/Underbucking%5B%5D
- Miller, Warren. Crosscut Saw Manual. USDA Forest Service, 1978, published by the U.S. Government Printing Office. Revised edition December 2003. See page 23 for underbucking example.
- Michael, David E. Saws That Sing, A Guide To Using Crosscut Saws. USDA Forest Service, December 2004, published by the U.S. Government Printing Office 64 pages.
