= Log bucking =

Process of cutting a felled and delimbed tree into logs

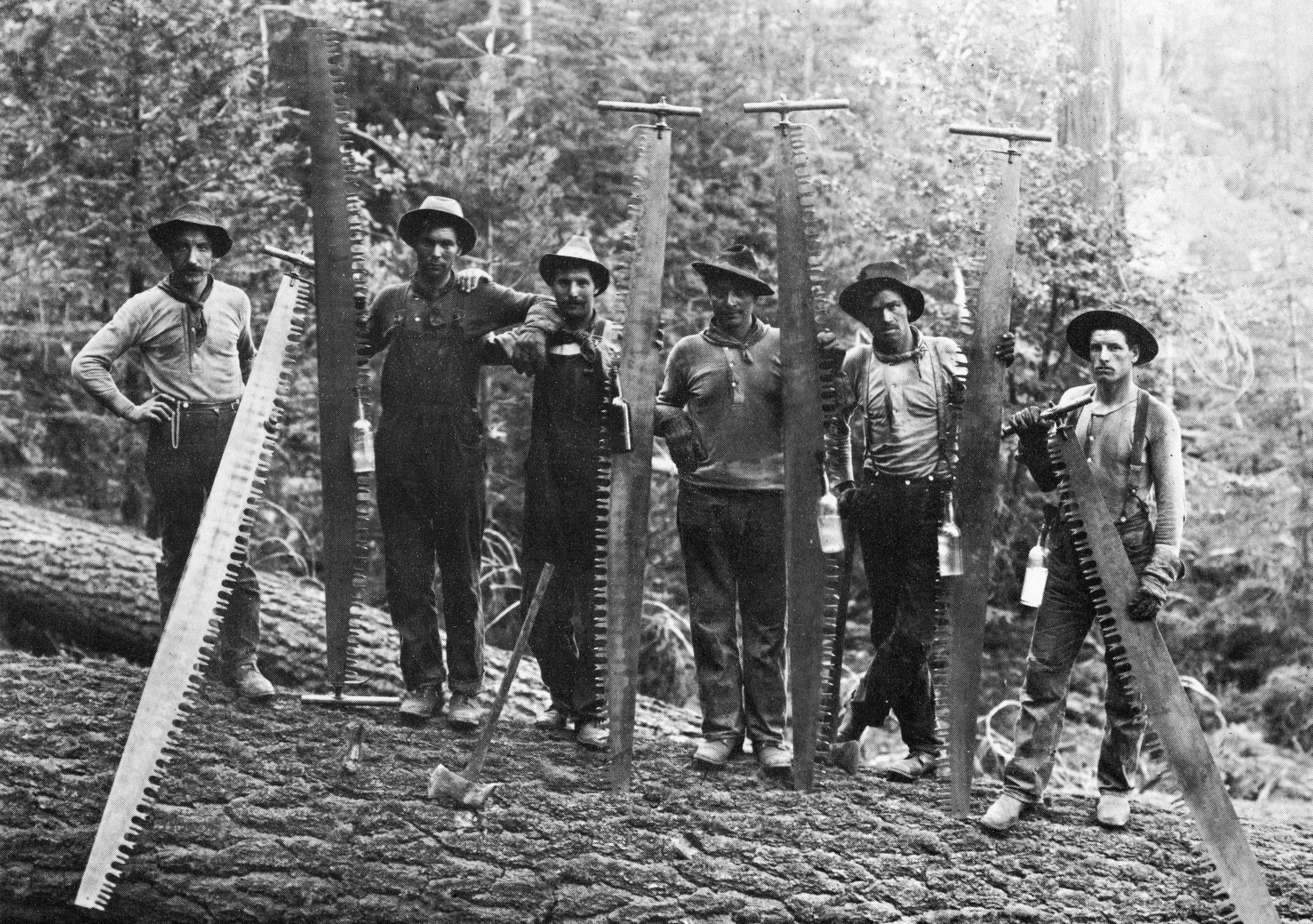
A crew of log buckers with crosscut saws in 1914.

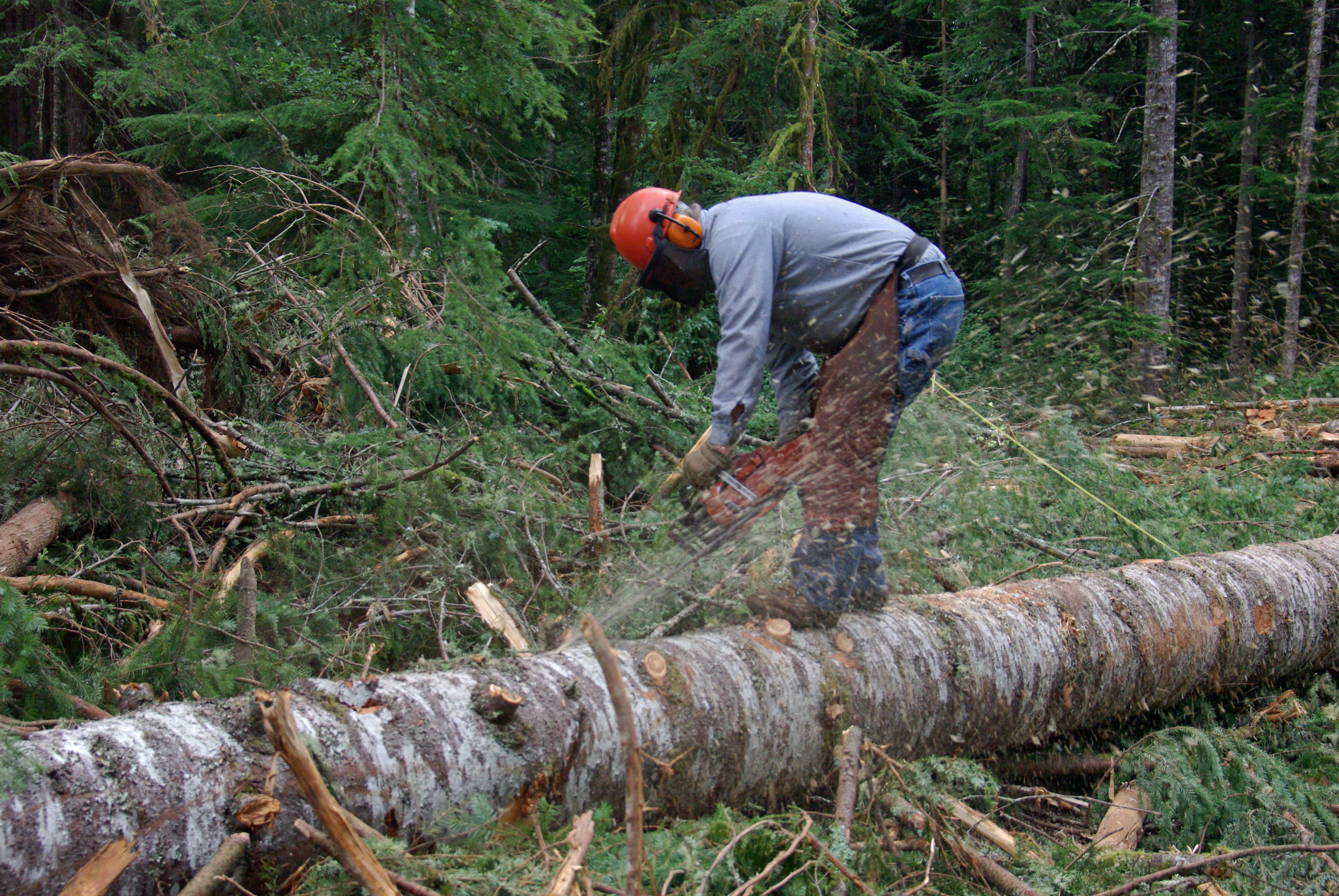
Bucker limbing dead branch stubs with a chainsaw, also known as knot bumping

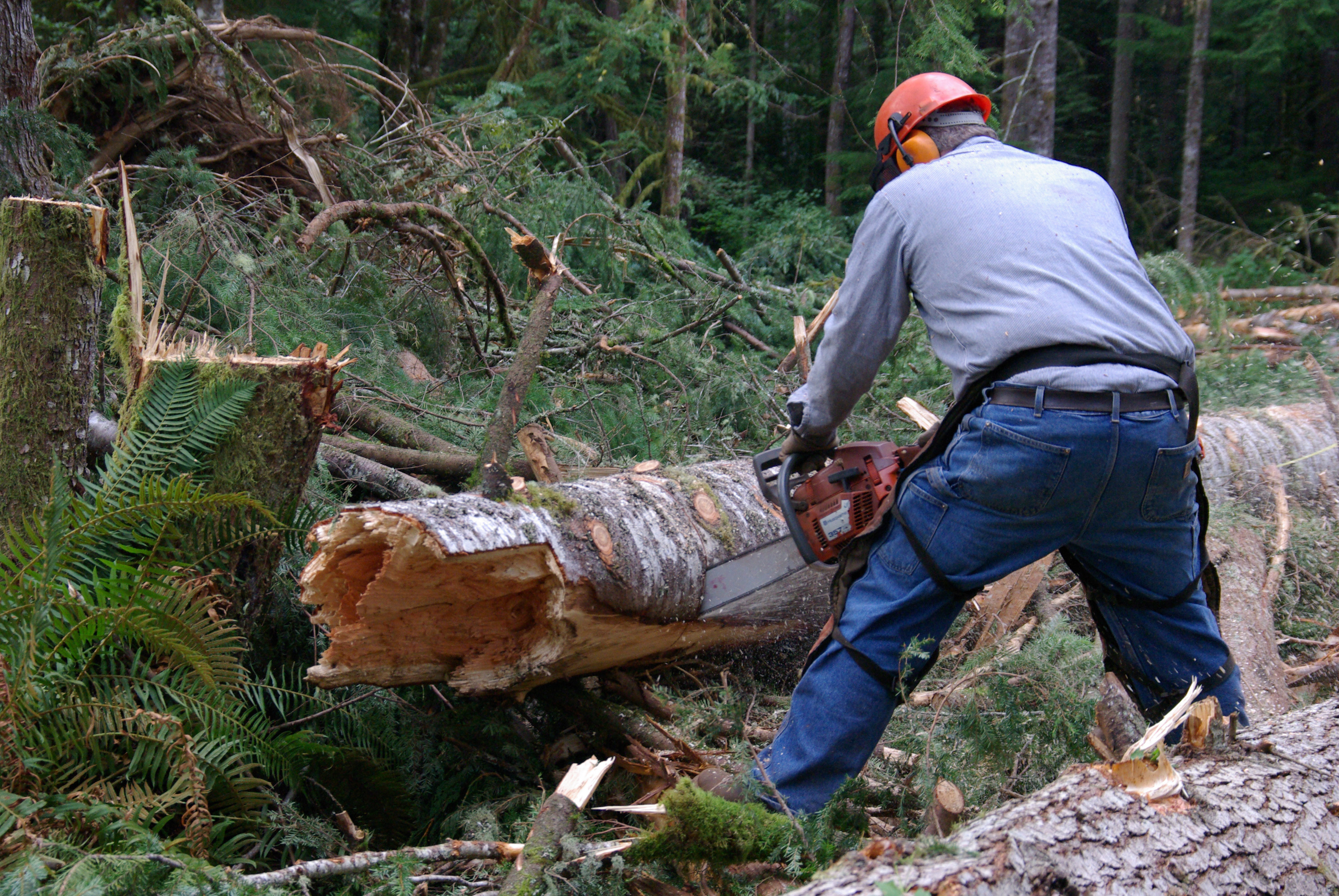
Bucker making a bucking cut with a chainsaw

Bucking, splitting and stacking logs for firewood in Kõrvemaa, Estonia (October 2022)

Bucking is the process of cutting a felled and delimbed tree into logs. Significant value can be lost by sub-optimal bucking because logs destined for plywood, lumber, and pulp each have their own value and specifications for length, diameter, and defects. Cutting from the top down is overbucking and from the bottom up is underbucking.

In British English, the process is called logging-up or crosscutting.

== Methods ==
A felled and delimbed tree is cut into logs of standard sizes, a process called bucking. A logger who specialises in this job is a buck sawyer.

Bucking may be done in a variety of ways depending on the logging operation. Trees that have been previously felled and moved to a landing with a log skidder are spread out for processing. While many of the limbs have broken off during transport, the remaining limbs and stubs must be trimmed. The bucker will gently anchor the end of an auto rewinding tape measure in the bark with a bent horseshoe nail, walking down the log with the tape attached to his belt, trimming as he goes. The tape is anchored gently so it can be jerked loose when the measurement is completed. When a suitable place to buck the tree is located, the cut is made.

Significant value may be lost by sub-optimal bucking. Local market conditions will determine the particular length of cut. It is common for log buyers to issue purchase orders for the length, diameter, grade, and species that they will accept. On the West Coast, common cuts on a large Pine or Fir tree are three 32's and a 10. There are often different prices for different items.

The person bucking is generally called a bucksawyer or bucklogger, or just a bucker and runs as many saws as he can, switching saws as soon as one is dull. The reason for this is the bucksawyer is typically paid per section of log he cuts. Generally, buckloggers at smaller sawmills are not fully mechanized. This part of the logging process is perhaps more dangerous than the felling of trees. The bucklogger is usually cutting from the edge of a treepile which can be 20 feet high and as long as there is room to dump them from the truck. Each tree must be picked out of the pile and cut so that a controlled fall of more trees can be worked as the former fall has been cut and skidded to its respective pile.

== Terminology ==
The pieces of bucked logs may be known by several names. Bolts are the pieces of a log which have been bucked into specific lengths which are less than 8 feet (2.4 m), especially short lengths. The etymology of bolt is related to being short and stout and related to knock, and strike possibly because bolts were traditionally split into wood shingles, treenails, clapboards, etc. These pieces may be more specifically known as peeler, shingle, stave or pulpwood bolts. Billet is variously defined as a short piece of round or partially round wood (usually a smaller diameter than a block or bolt) or as a piece split or cut from a bolt, or sometimes synonymous with bolt, particularly when the pieces are intended as firewood, and sometimes means a piece of a billet after it has been split. Round is often associated with lengths of un-split firewood.

== See also ==
- Chainsaw
- Felling
- Hewing
- Limbing
- Logging
