= Piercing saw =

Type of saw

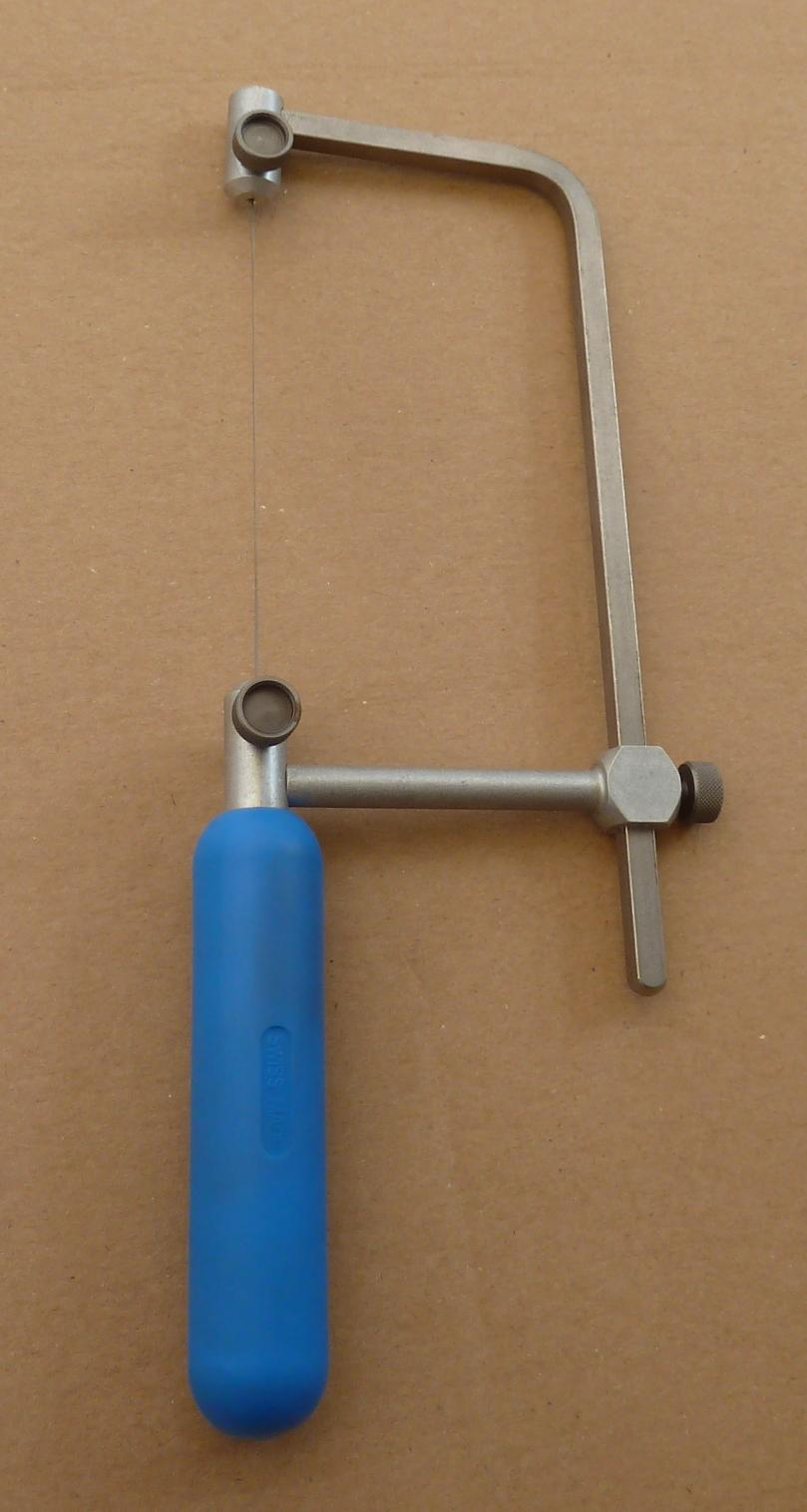

A piercing saw, also known as a jeweler's saw or jeweler's blade, is a type of saw commonly used in jewelry making on sheet metal. It is usually used on softer metals as the saw is delicate.

Like a coping saw, a piercing saw holds the blade in tension in a metal frame. As the fine blades frequently break, the frame is adjustable for blade length to allow the re-use of broken pieces. The frame throat size can range from 50 to 200 mm (2.0 to 7.9 in).

Saw blades come in many different thicknesses and the choice of blade will depend on the material being sawn and nature of the work being done. For very fine delicate work, and for cutting very thin material use a finer blade, and for general purpose cutting a heavier blade. Saw blades have a range of sizes, from finest to coarsest: 8/0, 7/0, 6/0, 5/0, 4/0, 3/0, 2/0, 1/0, 00, 0, 1, 2, 3, 4, 5, 6.

A piercing saw is often used with a V-board, also known as a birdsmouth board, which is a wooden board with a V-shaped cutout in one end. In use, the V-board is clamped to the bench so that the section with the cutout hangs over the edge. This allows the work to be held down flat whilst shapes are cut into it. Either the work or the saw frame may be rotated. The V-cutout allows the saw blade to pass through the work unimpeded. When eventually worn or damaged, the board is easily replaced.
