= Potash pit =

Potash pits were kiln sites which were dug and lined with drystone walling for the production of potash prior to the Industrial Revolution. The scouring or degreasing of the natural lanolin from wool requires the application of soft soap produced using fat and an alkaline potash solution which contains water-soluble potassium salts, such as potassium carbonate and potassium hydroxide (also known as lye).

== Purpose ==
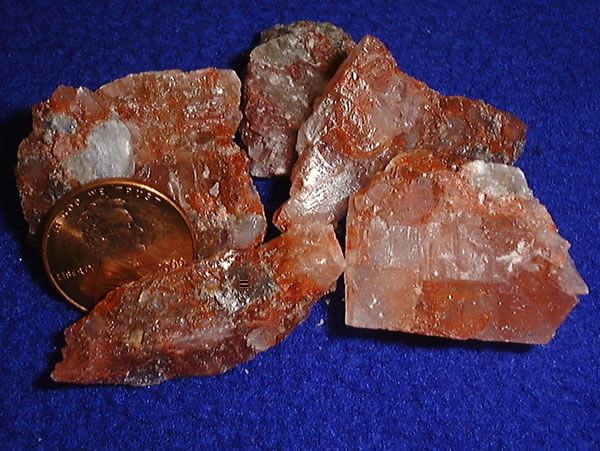
Potash

The potash pit was a basic stone lined ashery in which hardwoods such as birch wood or bracken were burned to produce ashes which were then placed in a copper cauldron manufactured from strips of copper and boiled together with water and quicklime. The alkaline solution produced by the ashes and added quicklime could be filtered to remove particles and once the required alkalinity was reached fats were added to produce a soft soap for the scouring or degreasing of the wool as a vital step in the production of wool for spinning into yarn.

== Location ==
Many potash pits were built in or near areas of suitable deciduous woodlands and as such they are an important landscape features indicating both the processing of wool and the presence of a suitable hardwood woodland present at the site or nearby at the time that potash pits were in use.

== Construction ==
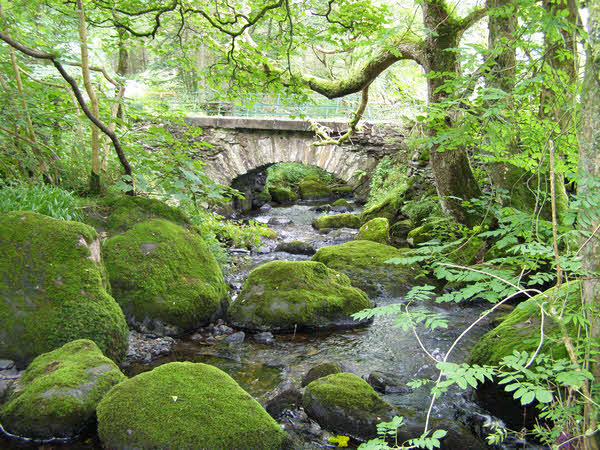
A view in the Lickle Valley

The often circular pits were built often into earthen banks and were lined with drystone walling. A tunnel fireplace was required to draw in the air for the burning conversion of the birch, bracken, etc. into ashes, used for heating the cauldron as well as the source of the potash.

== Geographical location ==
The pits are a feature found in sheep farming districts with extensive woodlands such as the Lake District in England. One example is located in the Lickle Valley, Broughton in Furness.

== Industrial archaeology ==
As a landscape feature, the remains of potash pits are superficially similar in appearance and location to Q-pits, another type of pre-Industrial revolution kiln site, which were constructed to produce white coal for use in smelting lead. Saw pits were also constructed in areas of woodland, however they were rectangular in shape and are easily distinguished from the aforementioned.
