= Beauchief Abbey =

Medieval monastic house now serving as a parish church in Sheffield, England

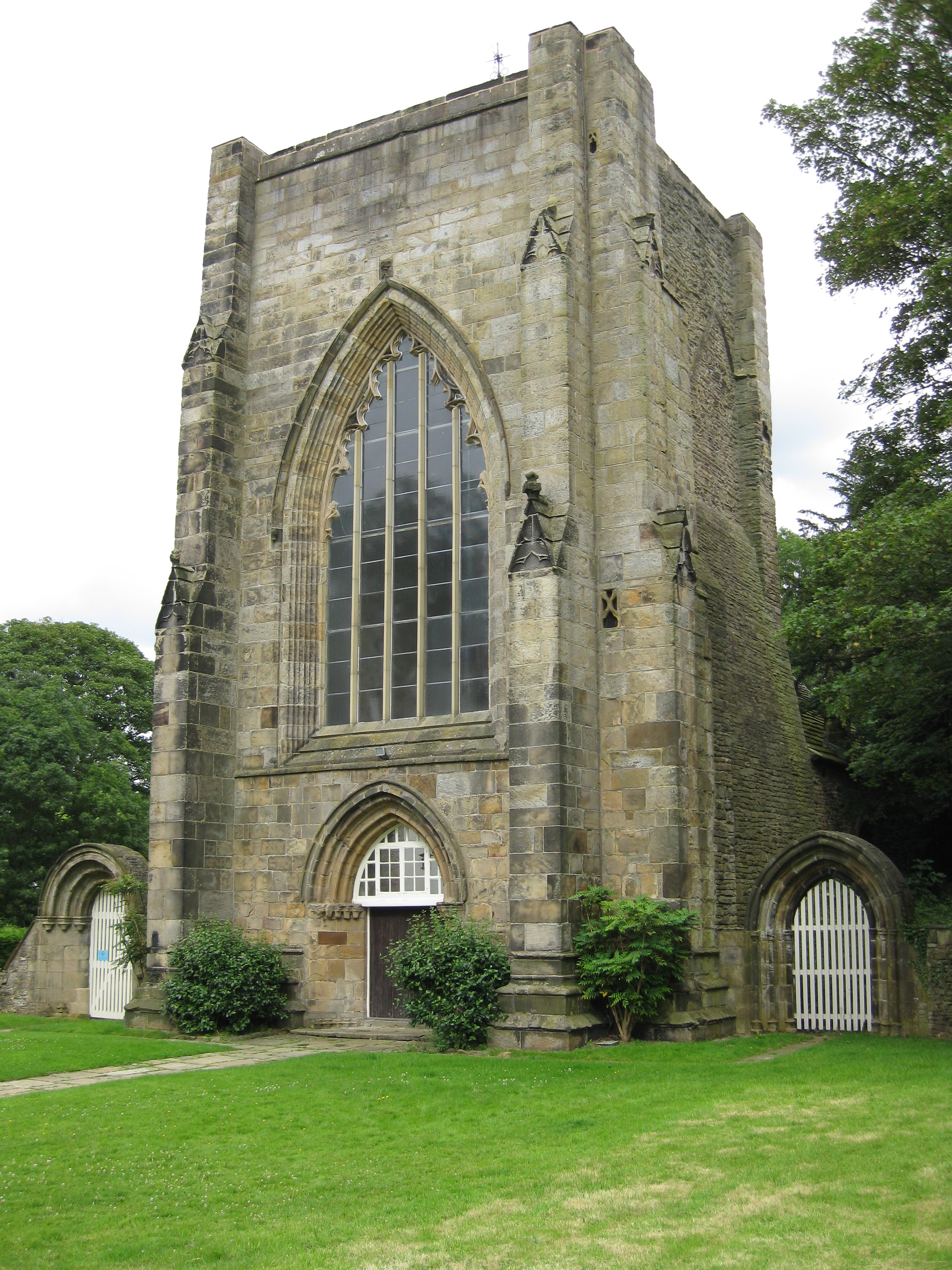
- Beauchief Abbey main tower

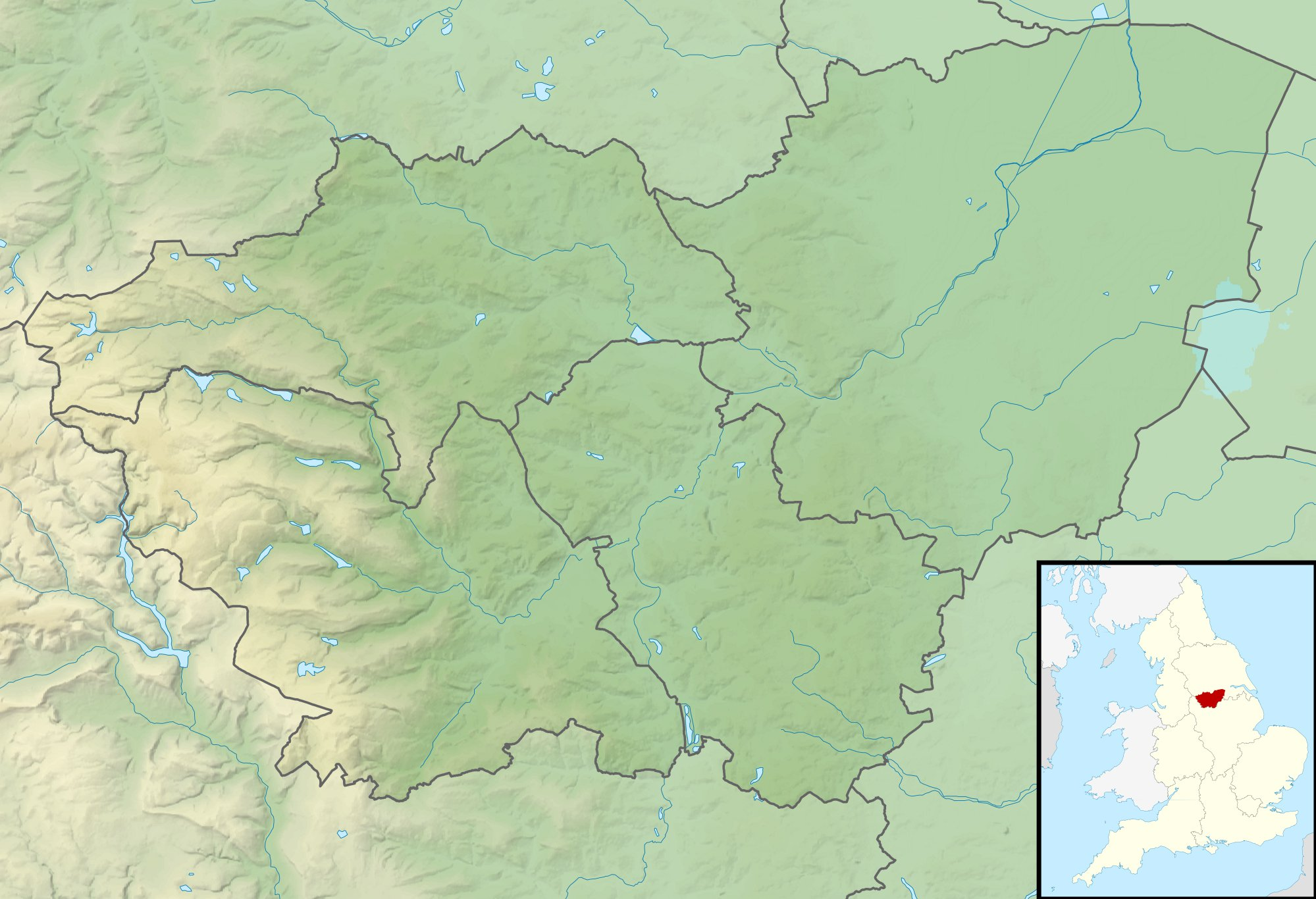
- Location within South Yorkshire
- Interactive map of Beauchief Abbey
- Location: City of Sheffield, South Yorkshire, England
- Coordinates: 53.333194°N 1.500849°W

Beauchief Abbey is a medieval monastic house now serving as a parish church in the southern suburbs of Sheffield, England.

== History ==
The abbey was founded by Robert FitzRanulph de Alfreton. Thomas Tanner, writing in 1695, stated that it was founded in 1183. However, Samuel Pegge in his History of Beauchief Abbey noted that Albinas, the abbot of Derby, who was one of the witnesses to the charter of foundation, died in 1176, placing foundation before that date. The abbey was dedicated to Saint Mary and Saint Thomas Becket, who had been canonised in 1173. Tanner stated that Robert FitzRanulf was one of the murderers of Thomas Becket and founded the abbey to expiate his guilt. Pegge also disputed this fact, showing that Robert FitzRanulf had no connection with the murder. The abbey once contained an alabaster altar-piece, which depicted the death of Thomas Becket. In the 1879 the altarpiece was known to be in the possession of a Mr. Foljambe, of Osberton, near Worksop.

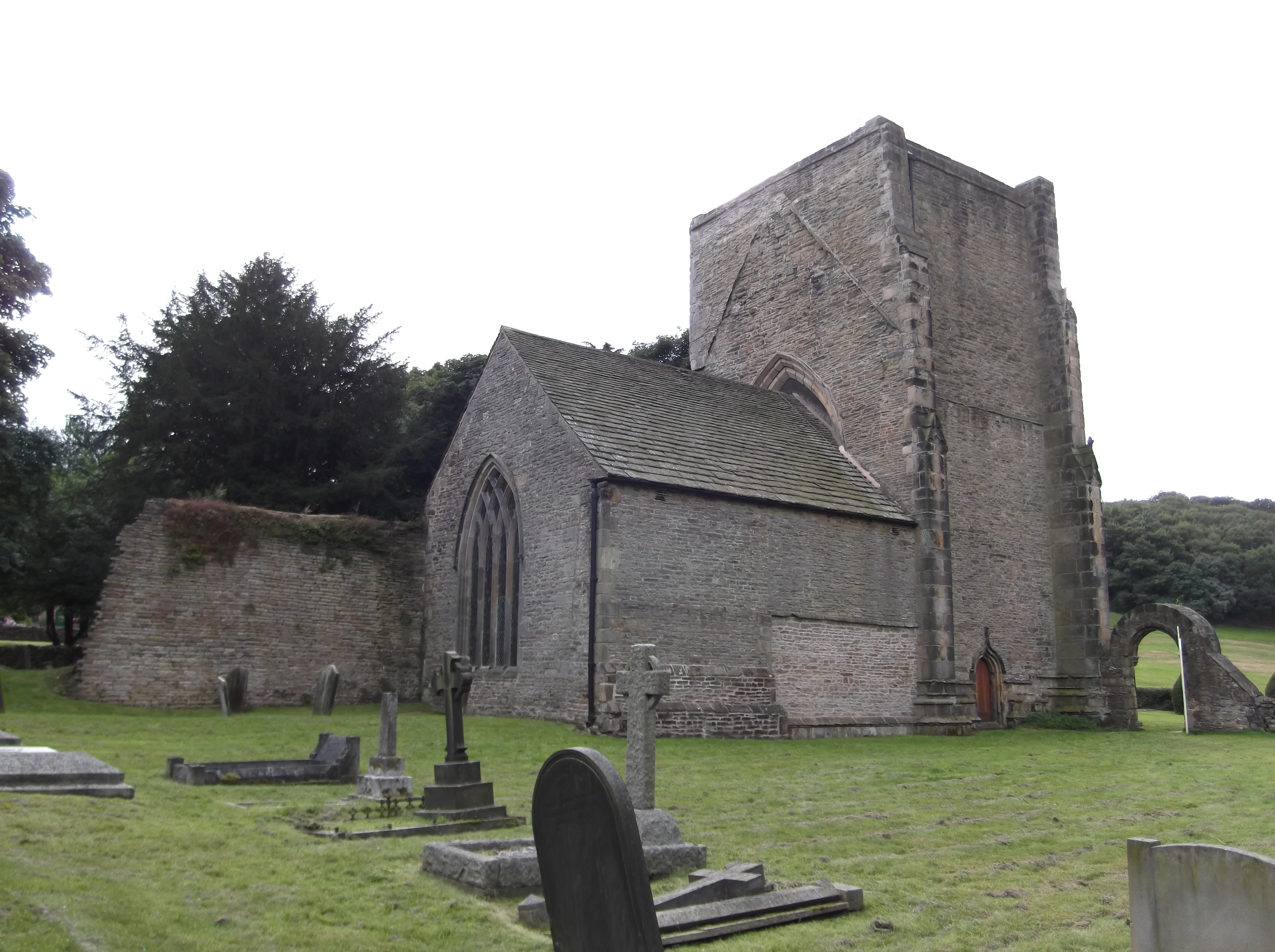
Beauchief Abbey from the north-east

The abbey was of the Premonstratensian order founded by Saint Norbert at Prémontré in France. Members of the order are known as White Canons. Beauchief was a small house comprising around 12 to 15 canons plus lay brothers. It had the full range of monastic buildings including the abbey church, cloisters, chapter house, dormitory and refectory. A stream provided water to the Abbey and to fish ponds.

As with most monastic sites, Beauchief was an industrial as well as a religious centre. Farming on the Beauchief estate and on outlying manors was important, and the monastery also controlled iron smelting, mineral extraction, woodland industries and mills on the River Sheaf from which Sheffield takes its name.

The Abbey was dissolved in 1537 and the estate became the property of Sir Nicholas Strelley, from whom it descended to the Pegge family through the marriage of Edward Pegge of Ashbourne, Derbyshire to Gertrude Strelley, heiress of the Strelley's, in Norton on 17 July 1648. In 1671 Edward Pegge built Beauchief Hall using stone from the now ruined Abbey. In 1923 the estate was purchased by Mr Frank Crawshaw. Some of the land was sold for housing development but much was presented to Sheffield Corporation.

== Beauchief Park today ==
Today only the western tower of the Abbey remains, together with some ruins (including a wall) to the immediate south-east. The tower is attached to a chapel (now a church) built in the 17th century, but what remains is a Scheduled Ancient Monument. The foundations of other buildings are visible and the medieval fishponds still exist. Much of the old estate is now occupied by two golf courses (Abbeydale Golf Club and Beauchief Golf Club), but several areas of ancient woodland remain: Parkbank Wood to the east of the Abbey, Old Park Wood and Little Wood Bank to the south, Gulleys Wood in the centre of the park and Ladies Spring Wood to the west. Public footpaths run through the estate, including across the golf courses and through several of the woods. The Sheffield Round Walk arrives from Park Bank Wood, running eastwards through Chancet Wood and on to Graves Park.

=== Ladies Spring Wood (also known as Totley Wood) ===
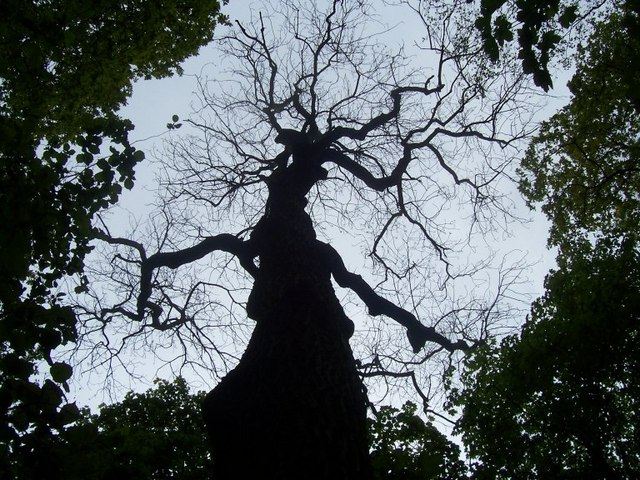
A dead oak tree creates a break in the canopy in Ladies Spring Wood

This is an arc-shaped area of mature deciduous woodland on a steep bank facing the River Sheaf to the west. It was formerly managed for coppicing with standards—the remains of charcoal platforms and q-pits are still to be found here. It is currently managed by Sheffield City Council for wildlife and public recreation, and has two public footpaths running through. The trees today are mainly sessile oak, with birch and rowan on the upper slopes and ash and alder on the lower slopes and on the river terrace, with small numbers of other species also represented. The upper terrace is dominated by rhododendrons. The wood supports many birds, including white-throated dipper by the river and several species of hole-nesting birds including the nuthatch, the green woodpecker, the great spotted woodpecker and the lesser spotted woodpecker. There is significant evidence that this is primary ancient woodland, including:

- The name: Spring is Anglo-Saxon for coppicing, indicating that the wood existed (and was managed for coppicing) many hundreds of years ago.
- The shape. The wood's edge has several bends and zig-zags, characteristic of the surrounding land being cleared over a long period of time.
- The location: The River Sheaf on its western border used to be the boundary between the parishes of Sheffield and Norton; and formerly the boundary between Yorkshire and Derbyshire; and before that, the boundary between the Anglo-Saxon states of Mercia and Northumbria. Woodland on such boundaries is often left undeveloped.
- The absence of evidence of early settlements or field boundaries.

It has been designated a Site of Special Scientific Interest for its biological interest, under the name "Totley Wood". All land within Totley Wood SSSI is owned by the local authority.

=== Parkbank Wood ===
This is also an old mature wood, though it has seen more active use in the past and may not be primary ancient woodland. There is again evidence of charcoal and white coal manufacture in the form of charcoal hearths and Q-pits, and also evidence of former quarrying and boundary ditches, which may indicate that the area was at one time cleared for agriculture. This is also now mostly mature sessile oak, and has public footpaths granting access, including the Sheffield Round Walk.

The parkland, though it has had its topography altered for the golf courses, still includes evidence of mediaeval ridge and furrow farming.

== Burials at the abbey ==
- Robert FitzRanulph
