= Robert FitzRanulph =

Saxon lord

Robert FitzRanulf also known as Robert de Alfreton (c. 1117 – 1172) was a Saxon lord from Alfreton. He is notable for building a number of churches in Derbyshire, most notable of which is Beauchief Abbey. The abbey was dedicated to St. Thomas Becket, and it is believed Robert founded the abbey to expiate his guilt for taking part in the murder of Thomas, however this has been disputed. Robert was also responsible for founding churches in Norton, on the site of the present St James, Norton church.

He served as High Sheriff of Nottinghamshire, Derbyshire and the Royal Forests during 1165–1168.

He died about 1172 in Dronfield.
