= Nettlehirst =

Mansion house and estate in Scotland

Coordinates: 55.719°N 4.603°W

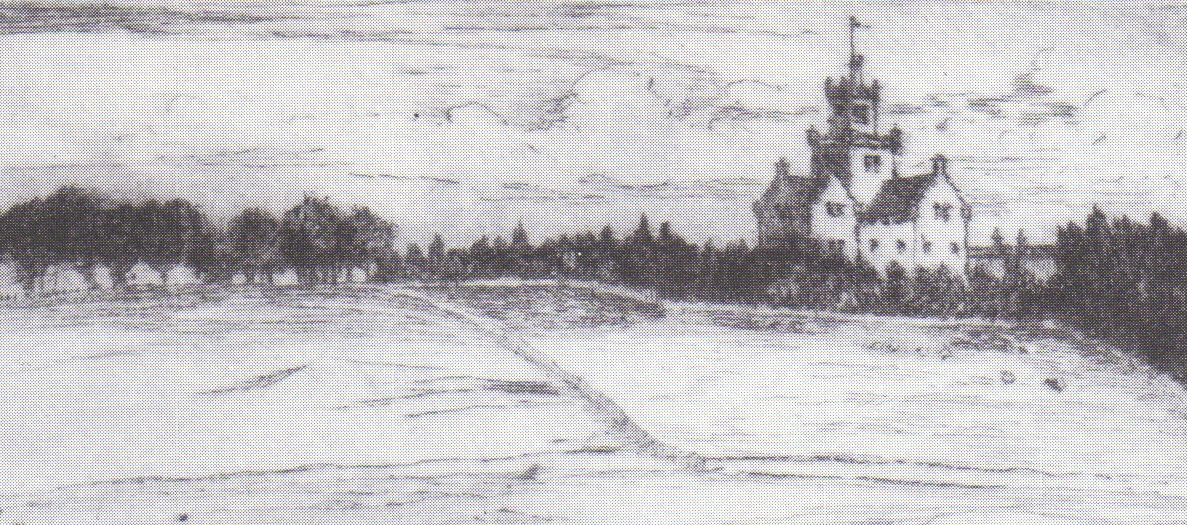
A view of Nettlehirst House

Nettlehirst or Nettlehurst was a small mansion house (NS365504) and estate in the Parish of Beith, near Barrmill in North Ayrshire, Scotland. The house was built in 1844 and burned down in 1932.

== Nettlehirst House and estate ==
The 1856 OS map shows an L-shaped building at the site of the later 'castle' with a detached outbuilding nearby and a saw pit close to the house. A Nettlehirst Townhead is marked nearby, lying to the north-west of the house. Few trees are indicated and the mausoleum was not yet built. A driveway led down to the road with a 'lodge-like' building at the entrance. No grooms cottage existed at that time. The 1895 OS shows the groom's cottage and stables, a much larger house, extensive tree planting, but no lodge house, outbuildings or sawpit. Nettlehirst Townhead is not named as such however the building is marked, somewhat enlarged and now L-shaped. A burial ground is shown at the end of a long path. A footpath runs from the house area down to Giffen Station. In 1902 a footpath connected the burial ground directly to Giffen Station and the road to South Barr and Gatend. The Nettlehirst Mains buildings are smaller and partly roofless.

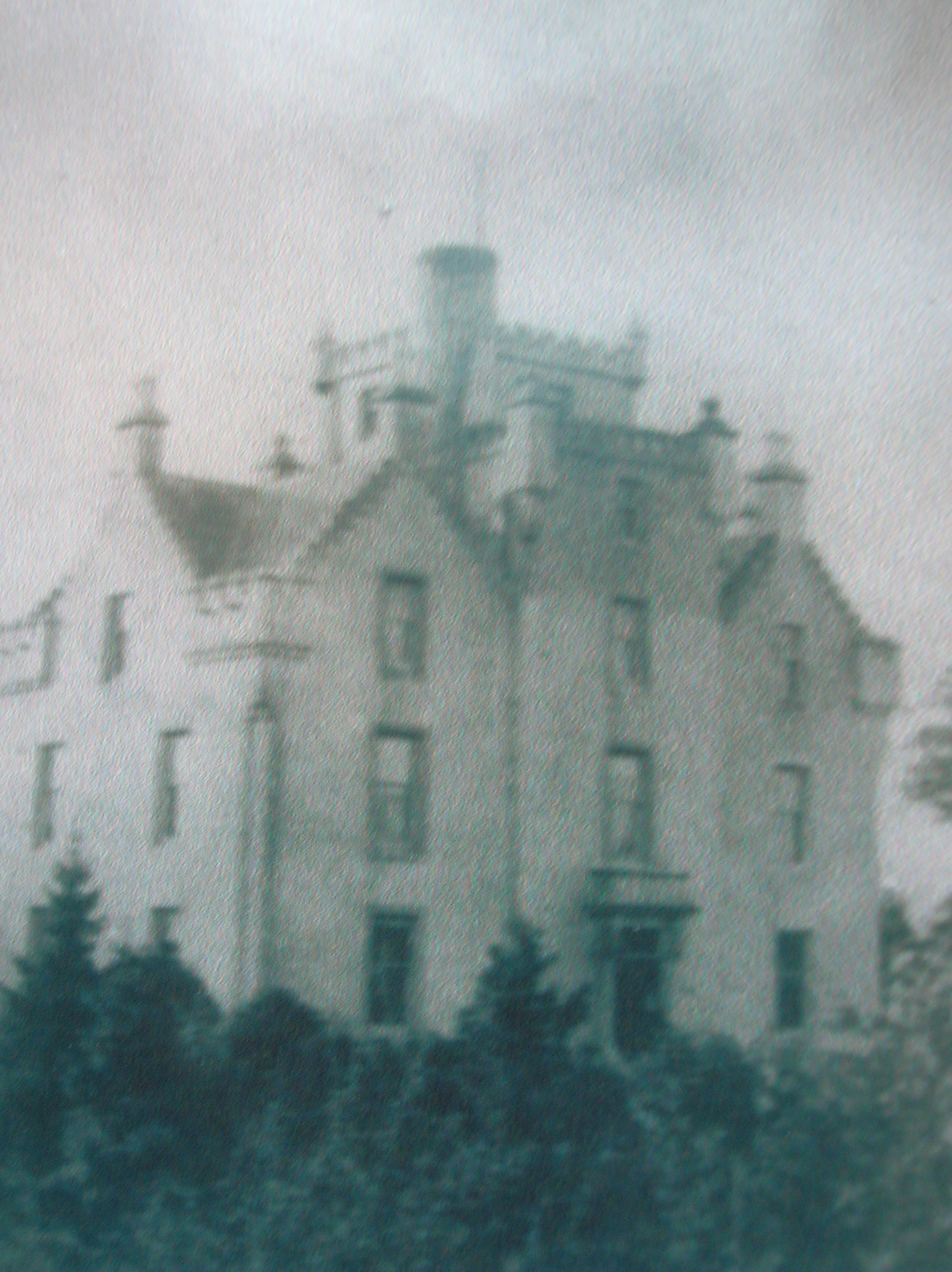
Nettlehirst House circa 1890

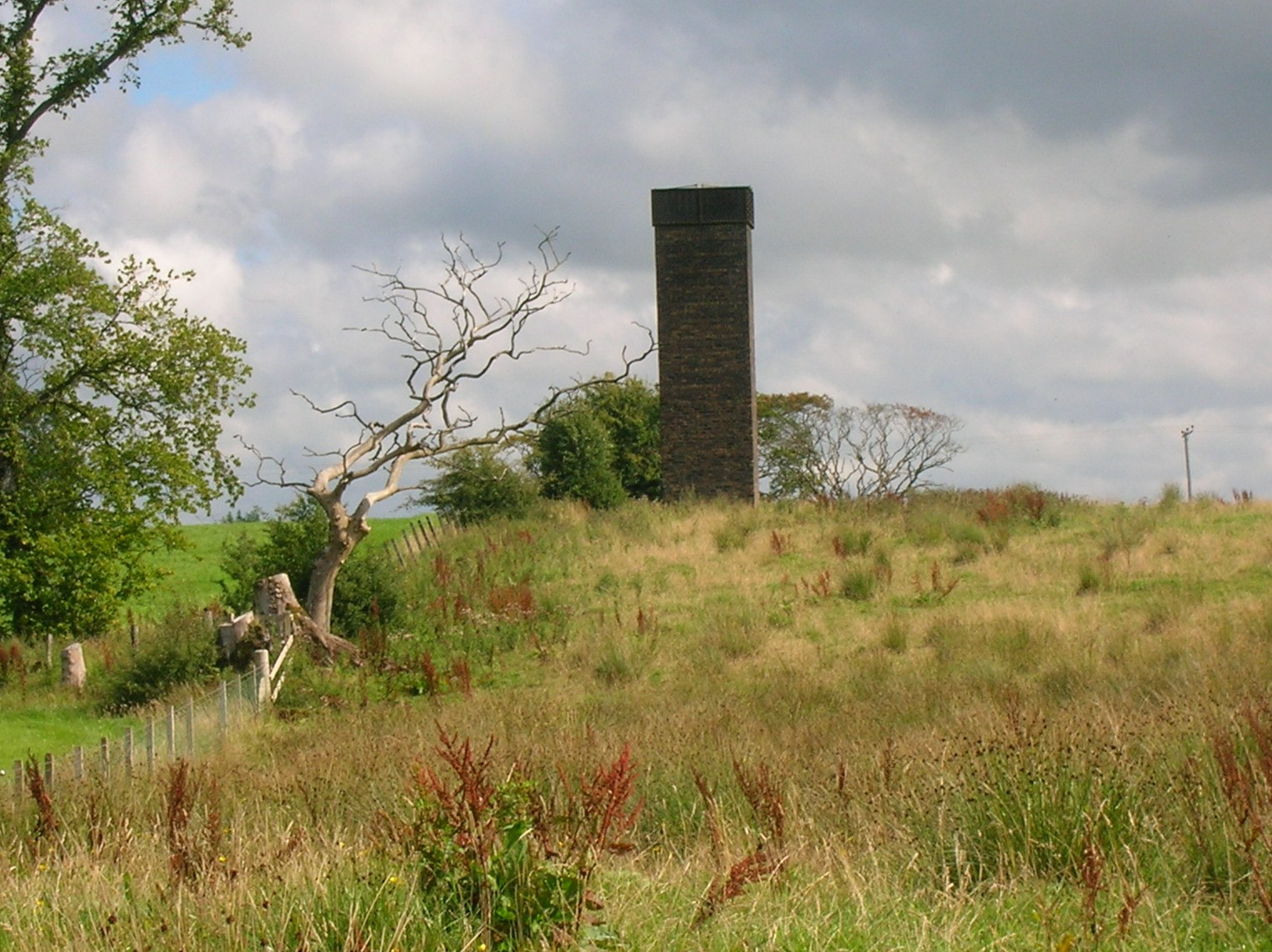
The Nettlehirst watertower

This was at its peak a fine mansion, somewhat eccentric in its architecture, also written as 'Nettlehurst', a castle-like structure with 16 rooms, situated on the high ground above the old limekilns, overlooking the Giffen Station, Giffen Viaduct, Barrmill and the Dusk Water. It had a five-storey central tower and was surrounded by three-storey crow-stepped wings. The Burns family built Nettlehirst House in 1844.

Davis sees the house as being an enlargement of a pre-existing house and attributes the style to lack of finance and amateurish design. The unusual gate-piers, one is taller than the other, still look onto the former groom's cottage. Other buildings nearby were the homefarm and accommodation associated with the limekilns. The surviving ruin with the marriage stone may have been related to the quarry workings after the castle was demolished. It contains a concrete slab with steel rods for attaching a generator or such like.

The 1932 fire

In July 1932 the house burned down, possibly due to an electrical fire, as mains power was not installed in the district until circa 1935 however the house possessed its own generator. The dramatic fire coincided with the return from South Beach by a special train of Barrmill Sunday School trip on the line from Ardrossan to Giffen Station. Passengers climbed up and watched the fire from the quarry area. The fierce fire was clearly visible from the train and it was a talking point in the village for months. The Kerr family moved to "Drumrossie" in Beith.

The mansion house was never restored and shortly afterwards most of the dangerous ruin was demolished. The unusual entrance gatepiers, apple and pear orchard, boundary walls, mausoleum, farm and the stables, with its crow stepped gable ends and an 1811 marriage stone remain. The platform of the old tennis court is still apparent. The old drawing illustrated here shows that the area was heavily planted with trees, especially yews that were felled for their timber.

== The Nettlehirst Burial Ground ==
The OS Map shows a family burial ground located near woodland to the south of the old house site. The fine red sandstone structure still survives (2010) although the crypt is said to have been broken into during WW2 by soldiers 'looking for treasure' and the frontage stones are much disturbed. A further report indicates that the damage may have been caused by cattle. No inscriptions are apparent on the structure. The burial site is said to have been in front of the mausoleum, within the skirting wall and railings.

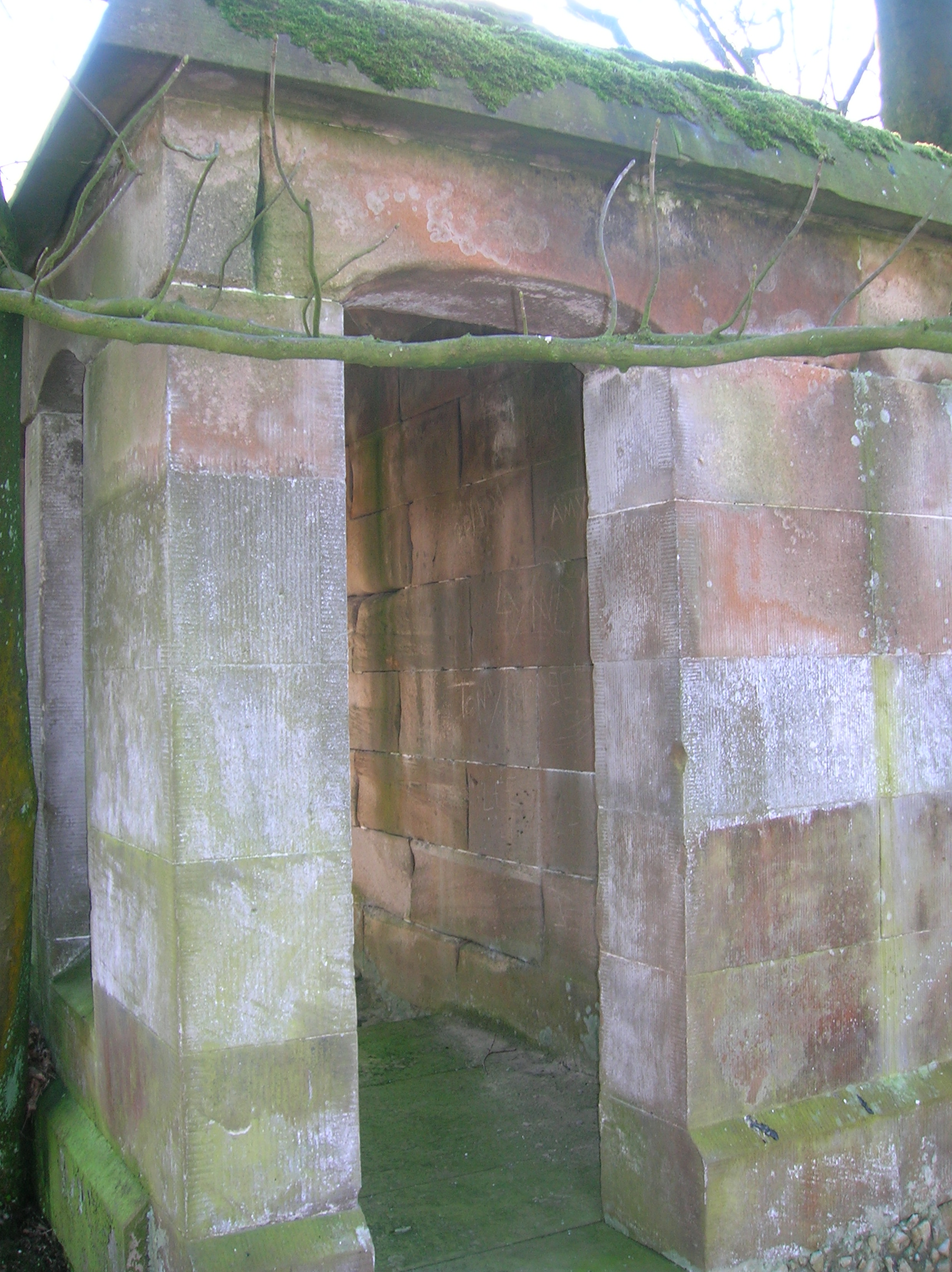
A side entrance

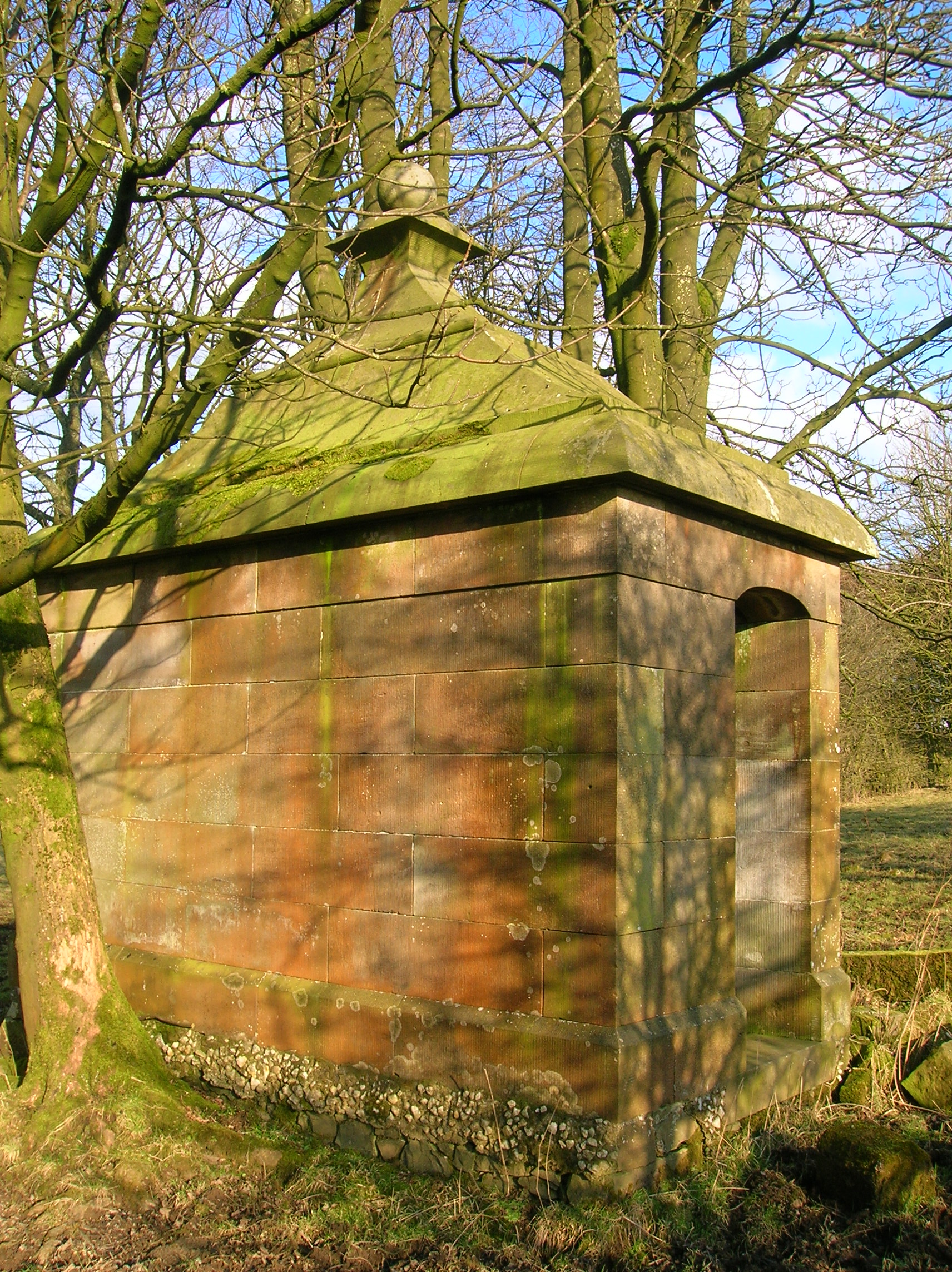
The back of the mausoleum

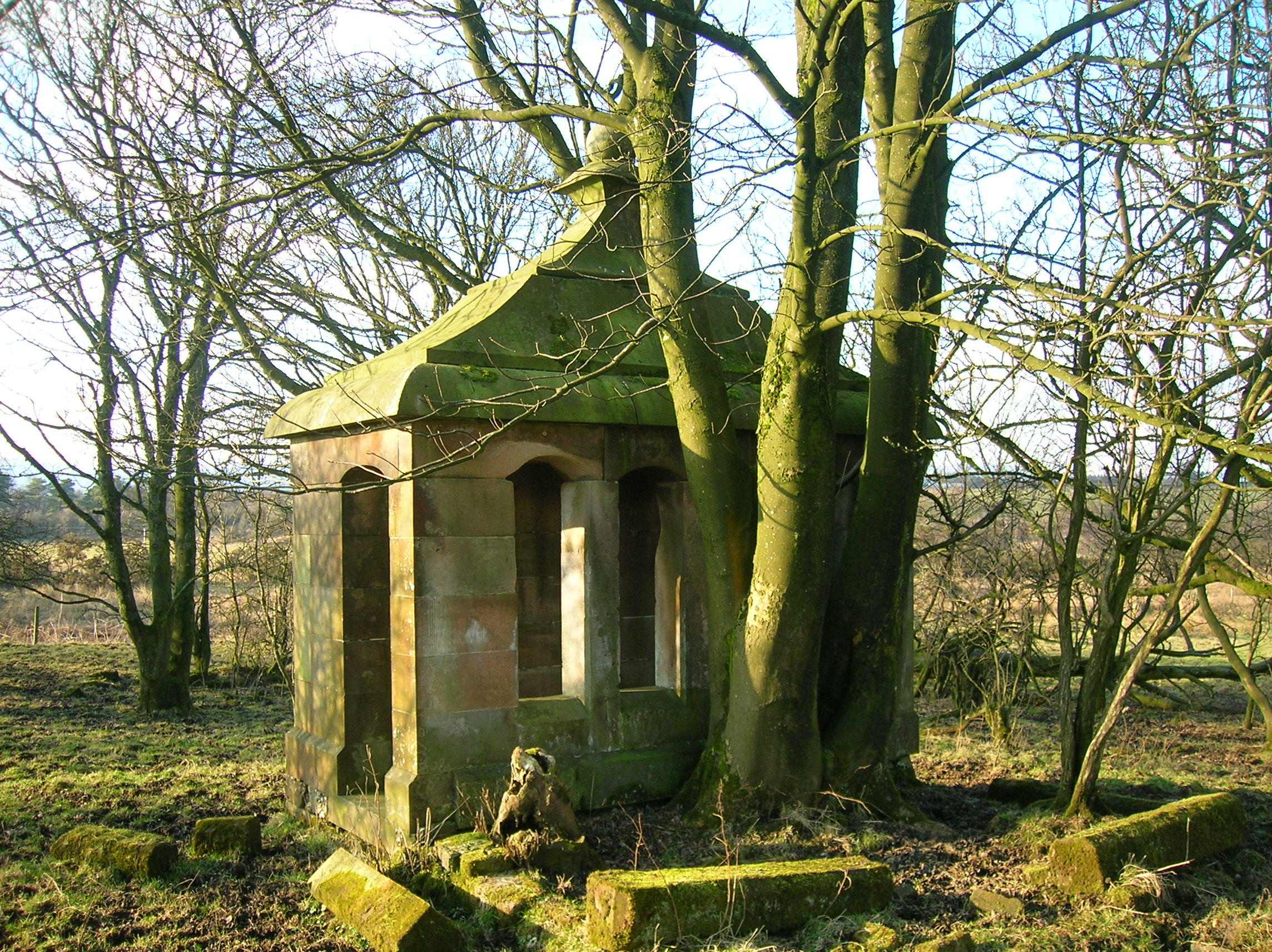
The frontage
The location of Nettlehirst House

== Owners and tenants ==
In 1804, Captain John Fulton of Grangehill married Catherine MacLellan, only daughter of the Rev. David Maclellan of Nettlehurst, Minister of Beith. They had two offspring, namely John and Isabella Fulton. Isabella married the Rev. Robert Crawford of Irongray. John's son was William Patrick Fulton. David Maclellan wrote articles under the name 'Urtica' (The scientific binomial for a stinging nettle is Urtica dioica). William Patrick of Roughwood obtained Nettlehirst from the Fultons and it later became part of the Giffin House estate.

William Burns, a shoemaker from Drumbuie, obtained Townhead of Nettlehirst in the 18th century and his sons Robert and James inherited it in turn; Robert having no heirs. William Burns, son of James, inherited it in 1845. William had three sons, James, William and David.

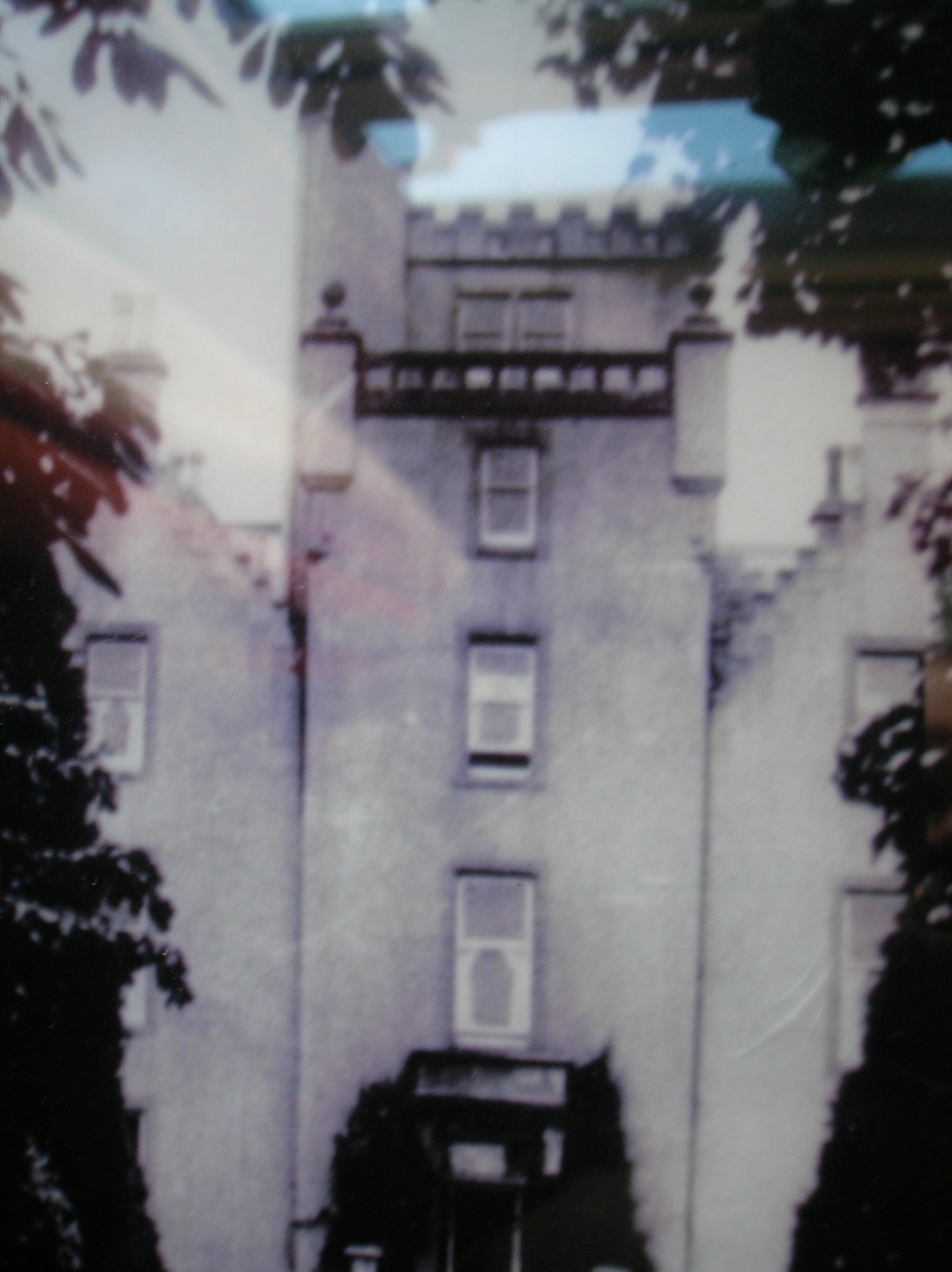
Nettlehirst House in 1923

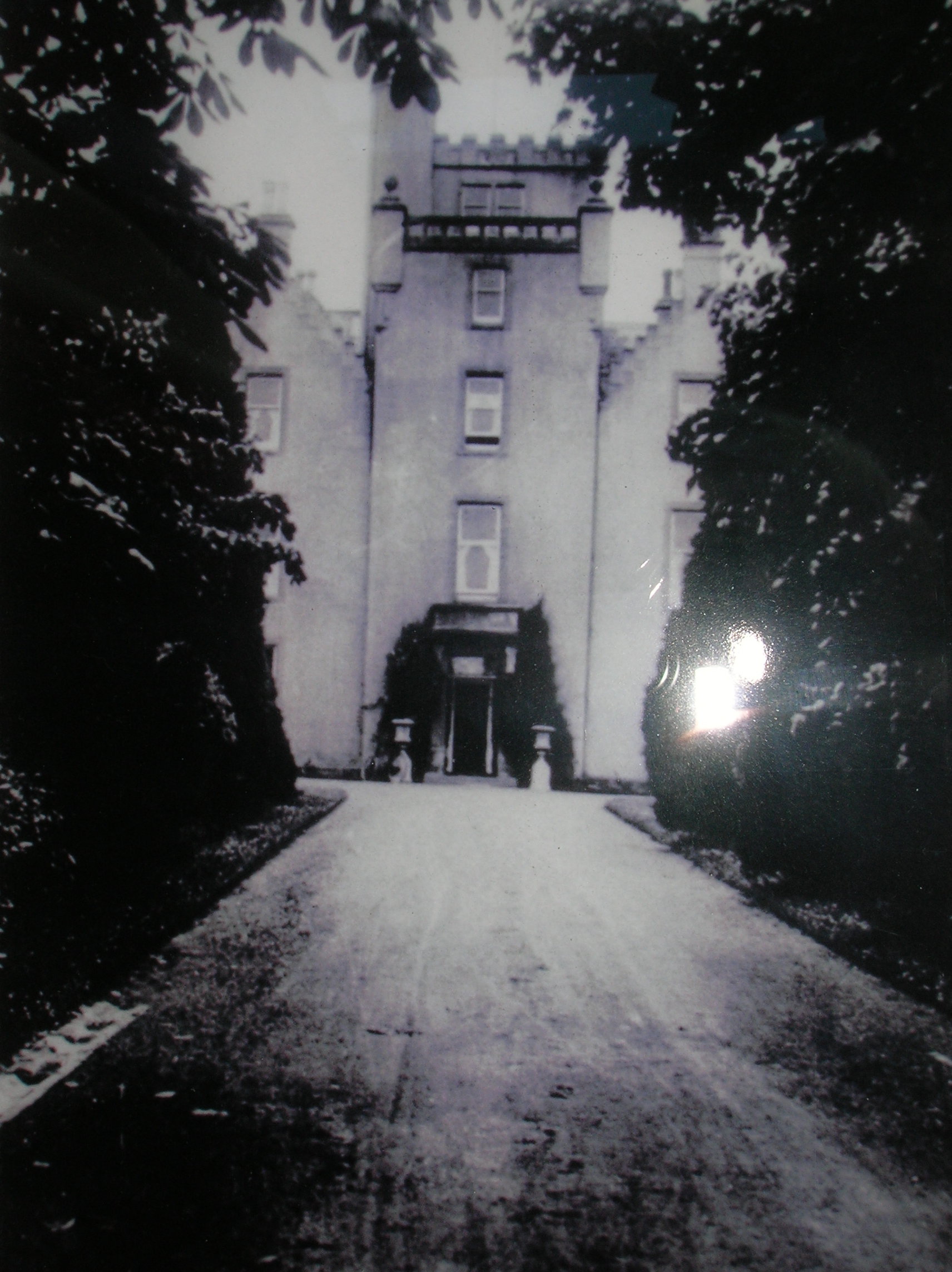
The house and the driveway from an old postcard

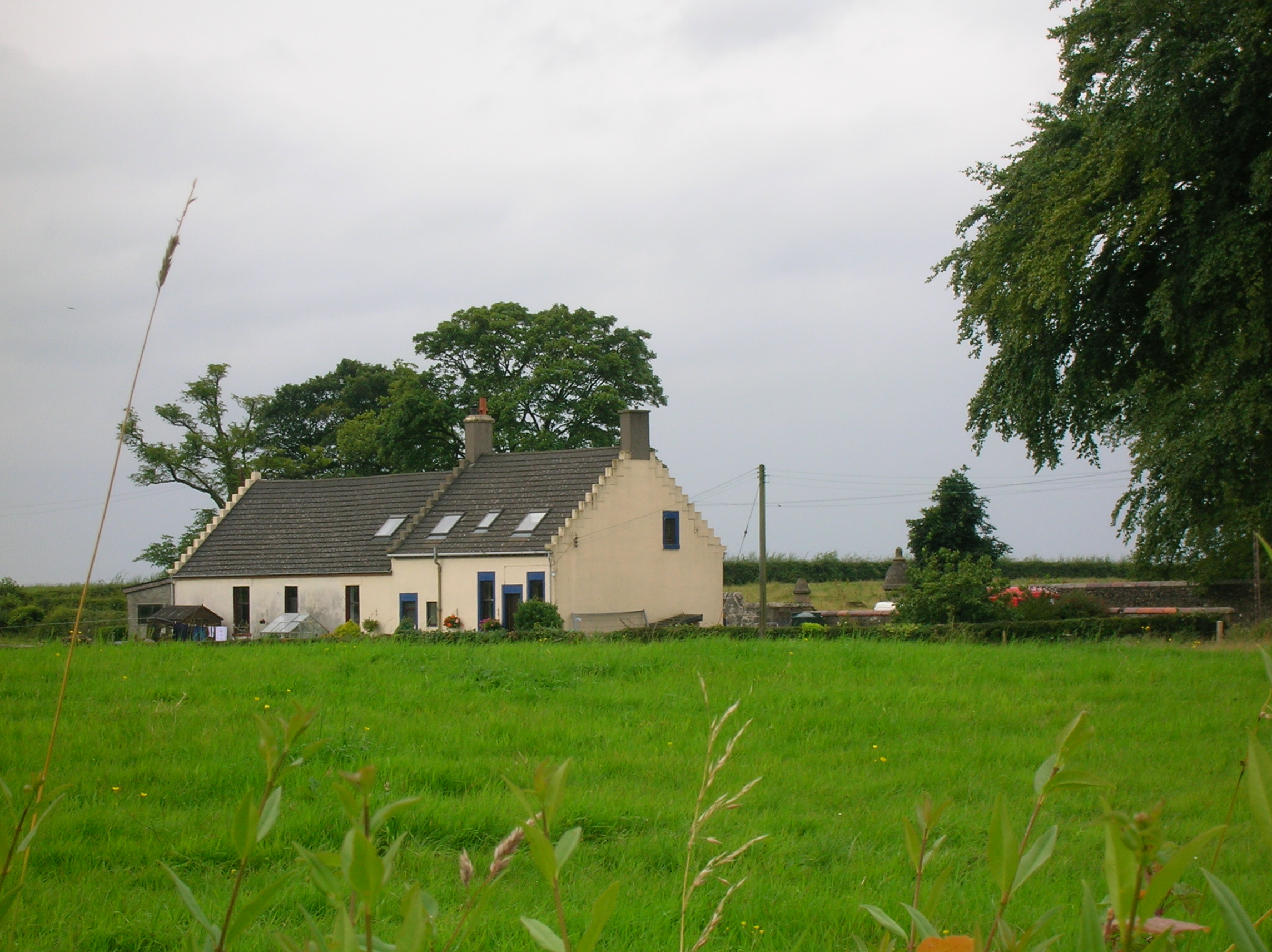
Nettlehirst with the old house gate-piers in the background

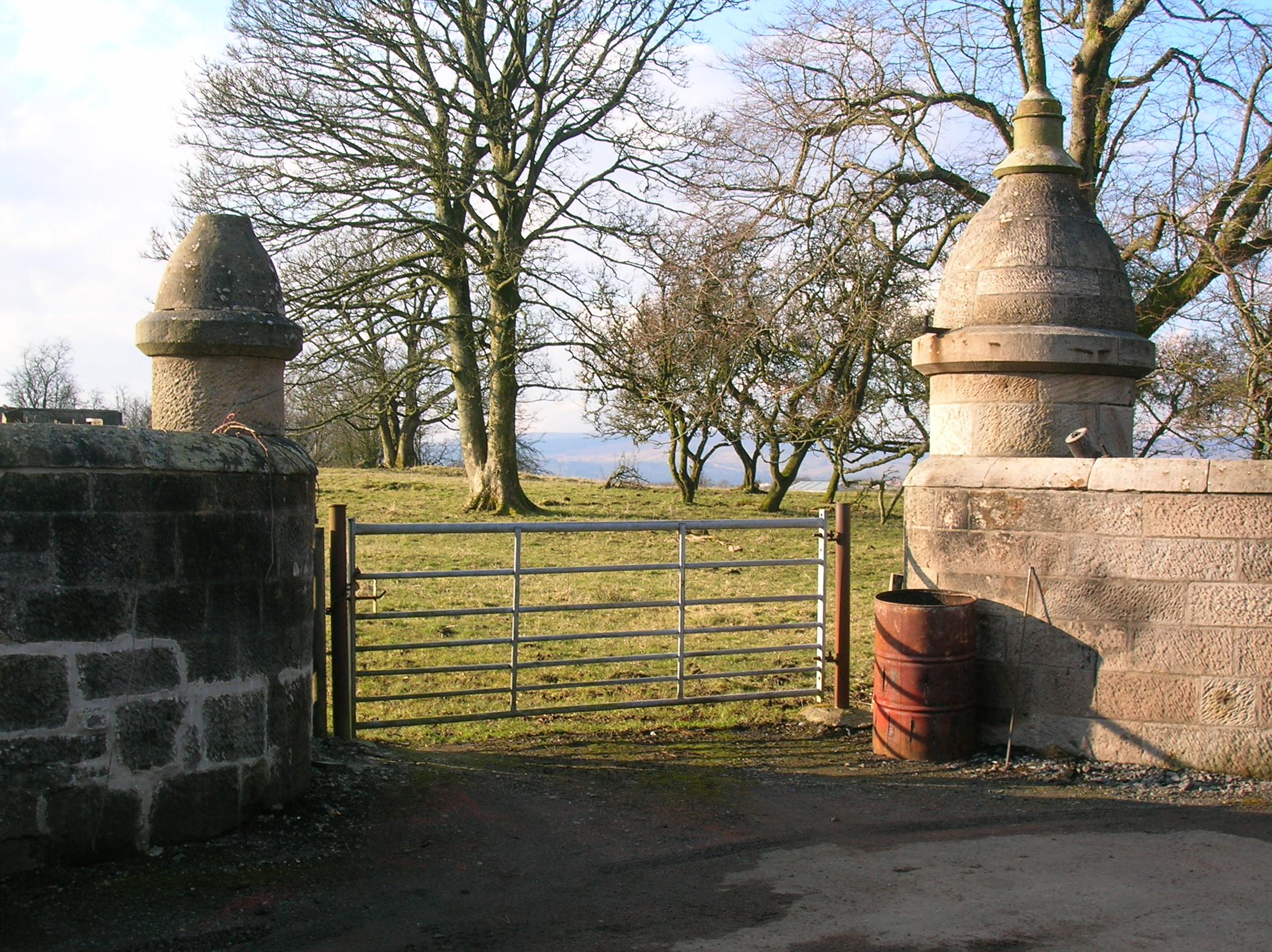
The unusual gate-piers

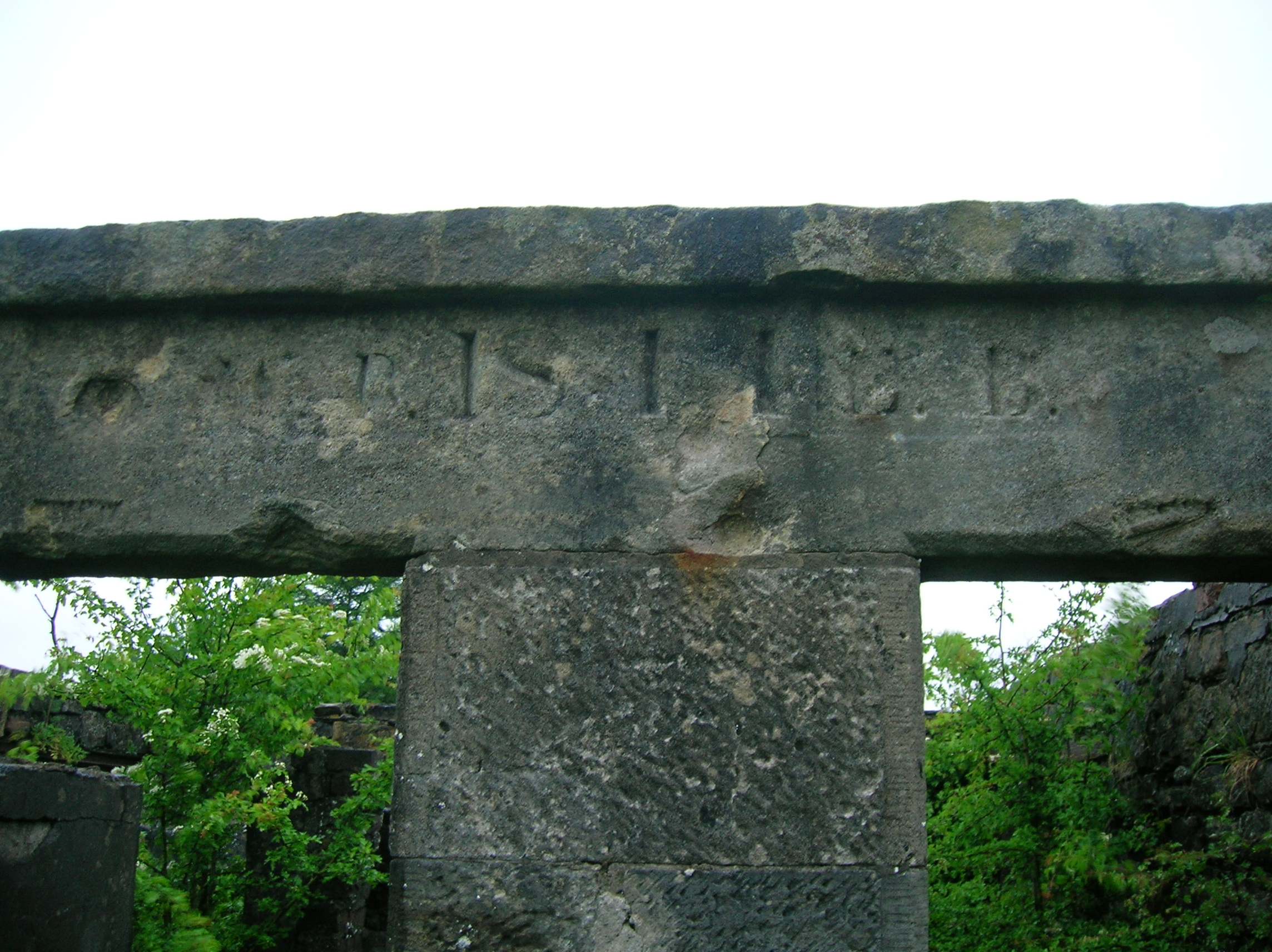
1811 Marriage stone possibly from the old Nettlehirst House predating the 'castle'.

James Brown, Writer in Beith, was the son of Hugh Brown of Broadstone and is recorded as 'James of Nettlehurst'. James married Janet, daughter of James Finlay of Easter Highgate, had a son Robert and died in 1855.

William and Anne Burns lived at Nettlehirst in 1901 according to the Census, together with their sons Walter and Albert. William is recorded as being a merchant dealing in 'fancy goods', also a toy-maker.

In 1915 it was sold to Mr Thomas Currie Kerr JP, at that time a well known ironmaster and owner of the limeworks. Reid records that Thomas was an engineering contractor and together with his wife, Eliza. Jane Donaldson, owned William Kerr and Co (named in honour of his father). Kerr's were based at Mavisbank in Glasgow, and specialised in moving heavy loads, such as locomotives. Road Engines and Kerr Ltd was its name just prior to being taken over by Pickfords. Izabel Kerr, daughter of Thomas Kerr, married Dr Ian F. Somerville, a Beith GP in 1932. In 2011 it was the property of the Gillon's of nearby Shotts Farm.

== Haghead ==
The faint remains of ruined cottages are still visible on the lane from Greenhills to Nettlehirst and these were once weavers shops and the steading on the corner was known as 'Nanny Pringle's o'the Haghead'.

== Micro-history ==
The Black Loch was a shallow loch situated near Nettlehirst House and it was once used for curling. The site was filled with earth and is now overgrown.

John Kerr of Nettlehirst, son of Hugh Kerr of Gatend, gave £20 a year and established a Society for Clothing, Blankets, and Clothes for the poor.

Daniel Montgomery is listed as a farmer at Nettlehirst in the 1850s and William Burns was resident at Nettlehirst House.

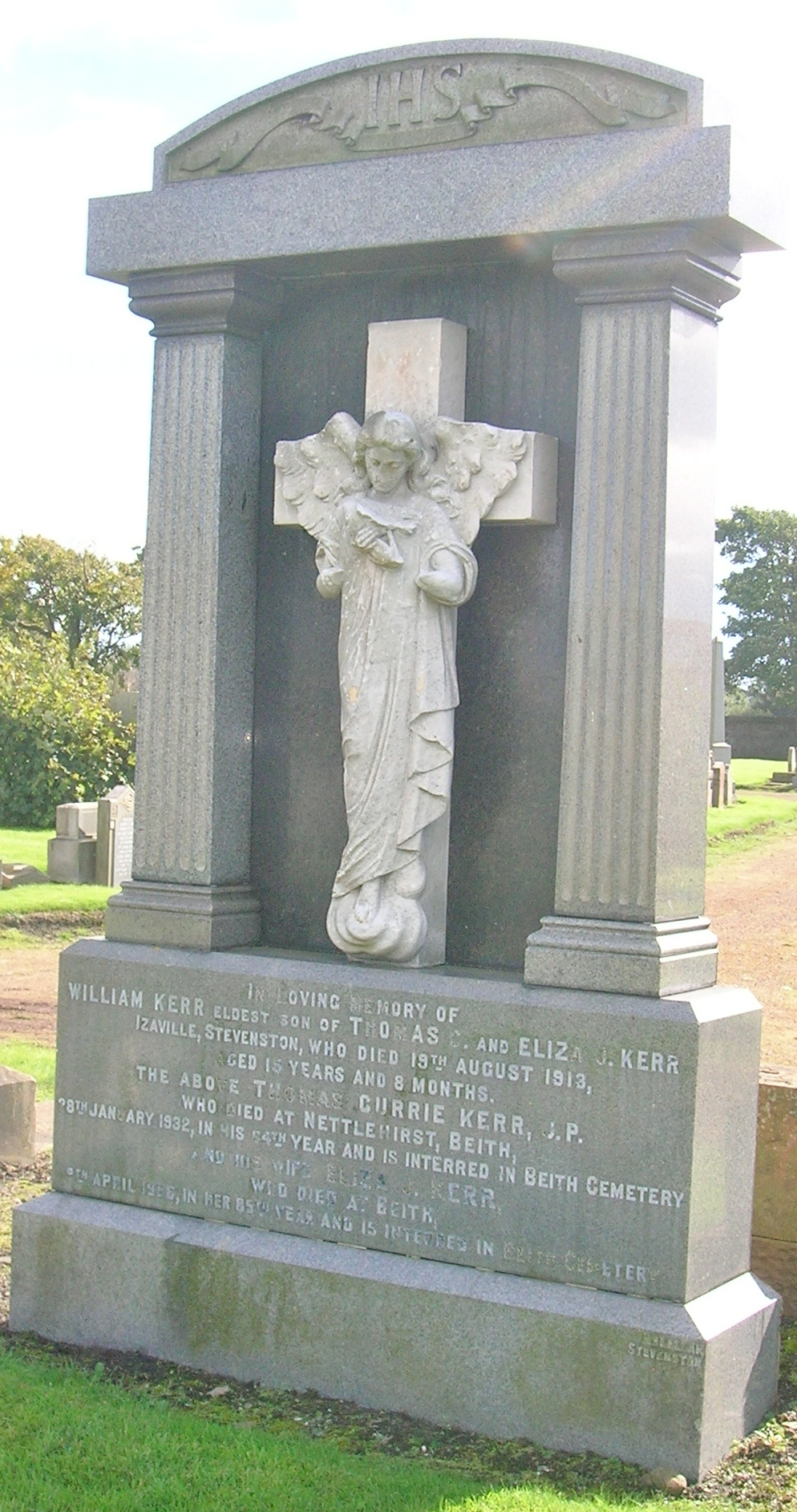
Memorial to Thomas Currie Kerr and his wife Eliza at Stevenston

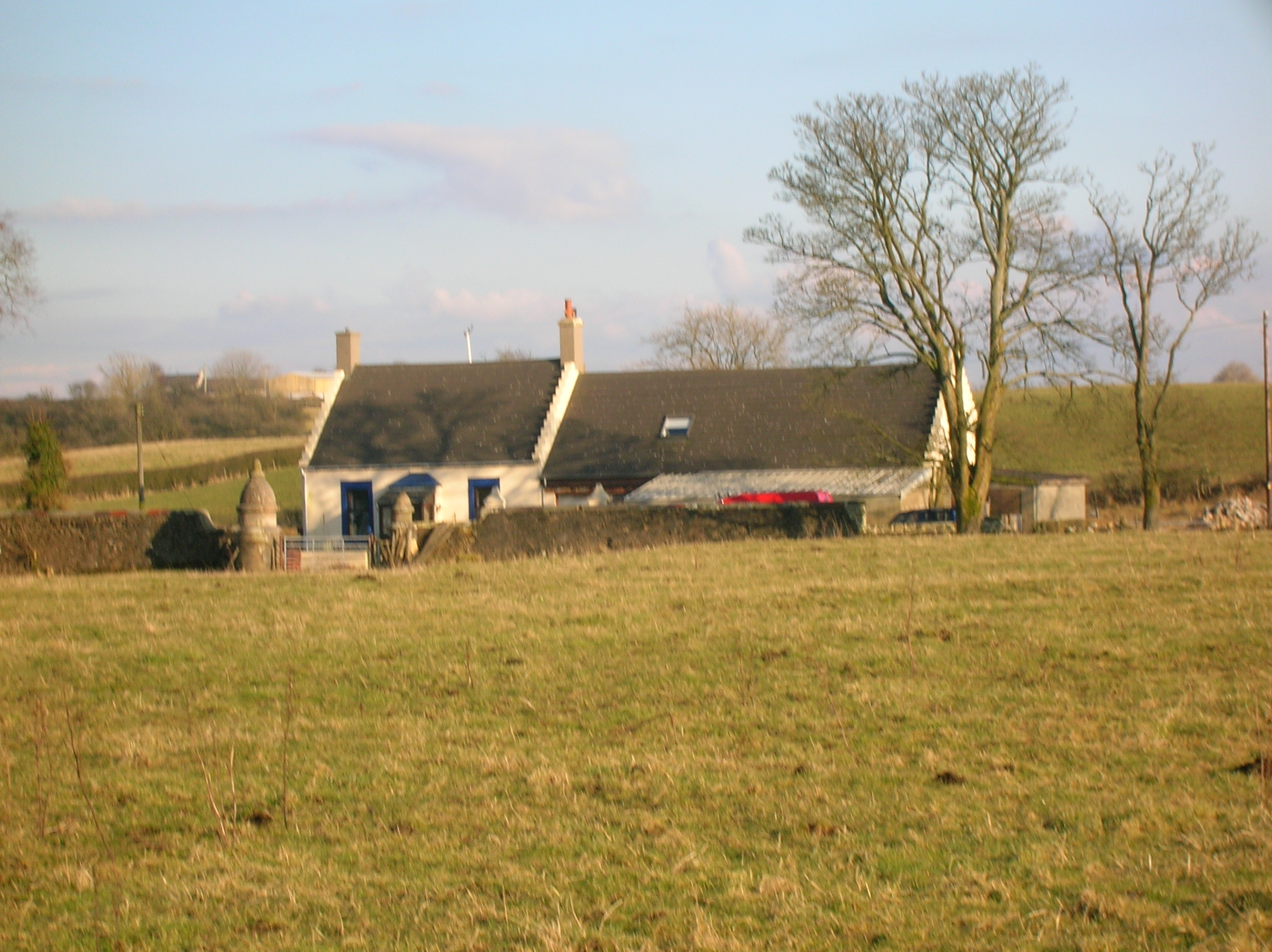
Nettlehirst's old groom's cottage and stables

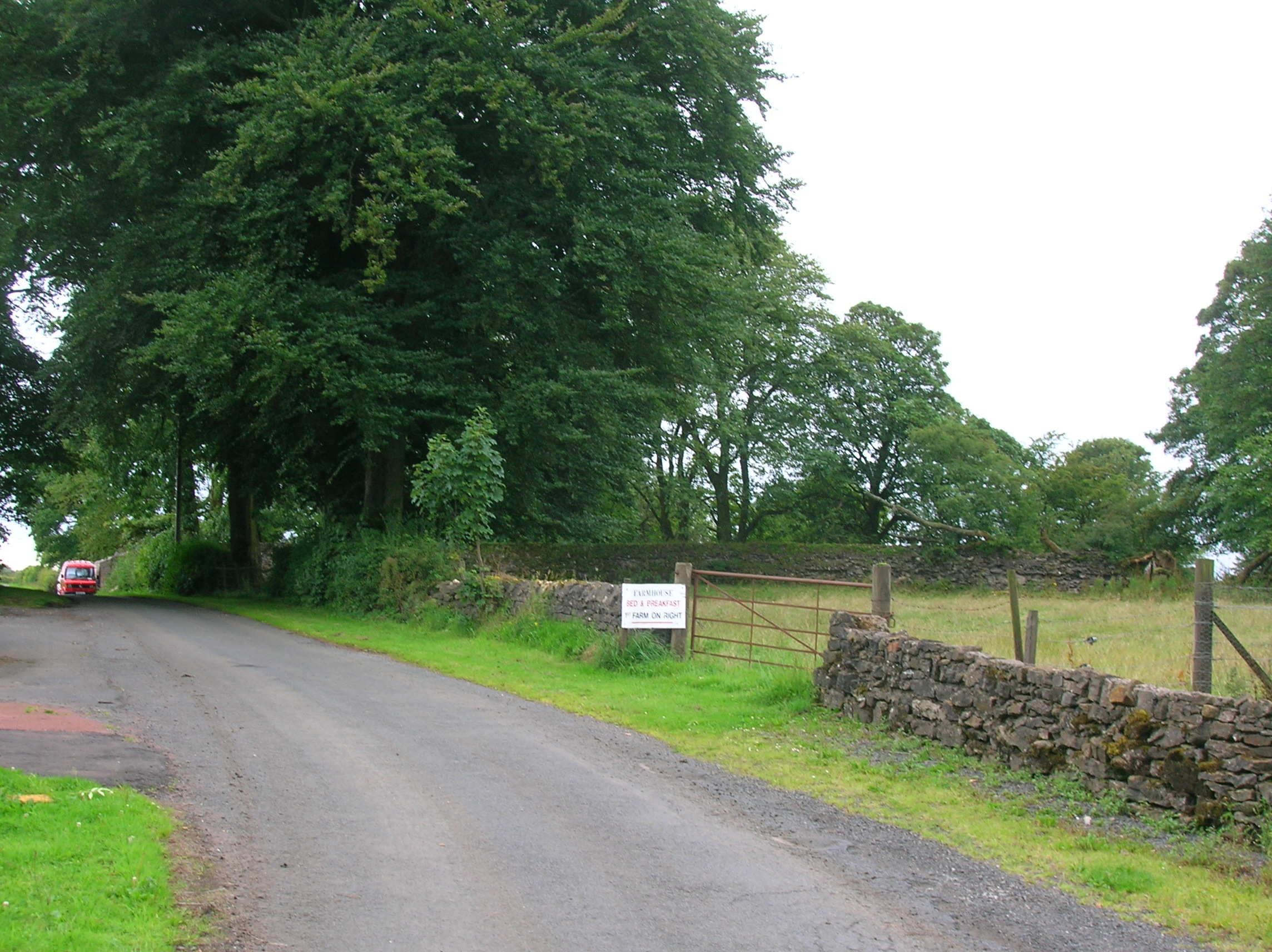
Nettlehirst old estate wall and trees

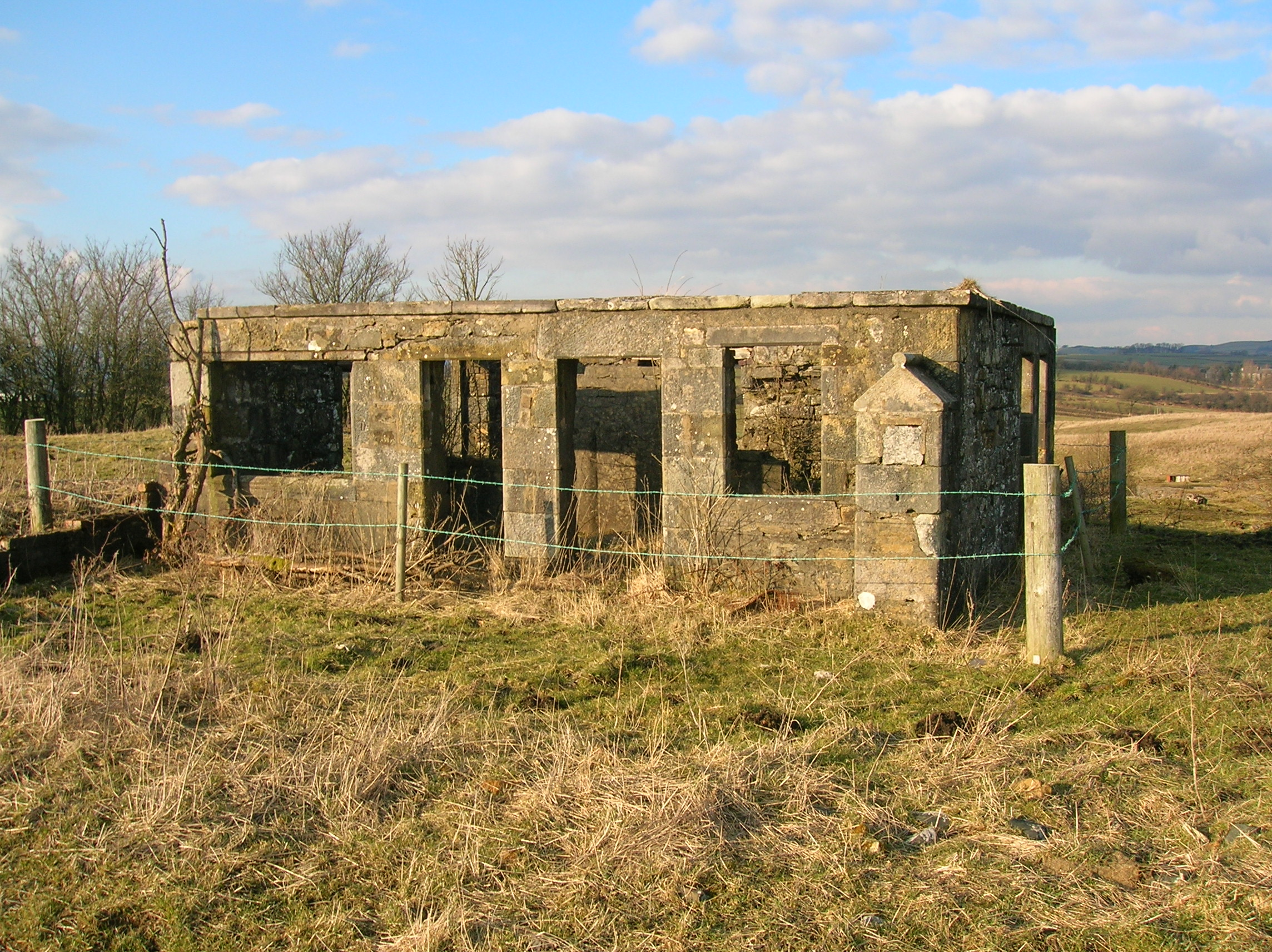
A ruin within the Nettlehirst grounds bearing an 1811 marriage stone

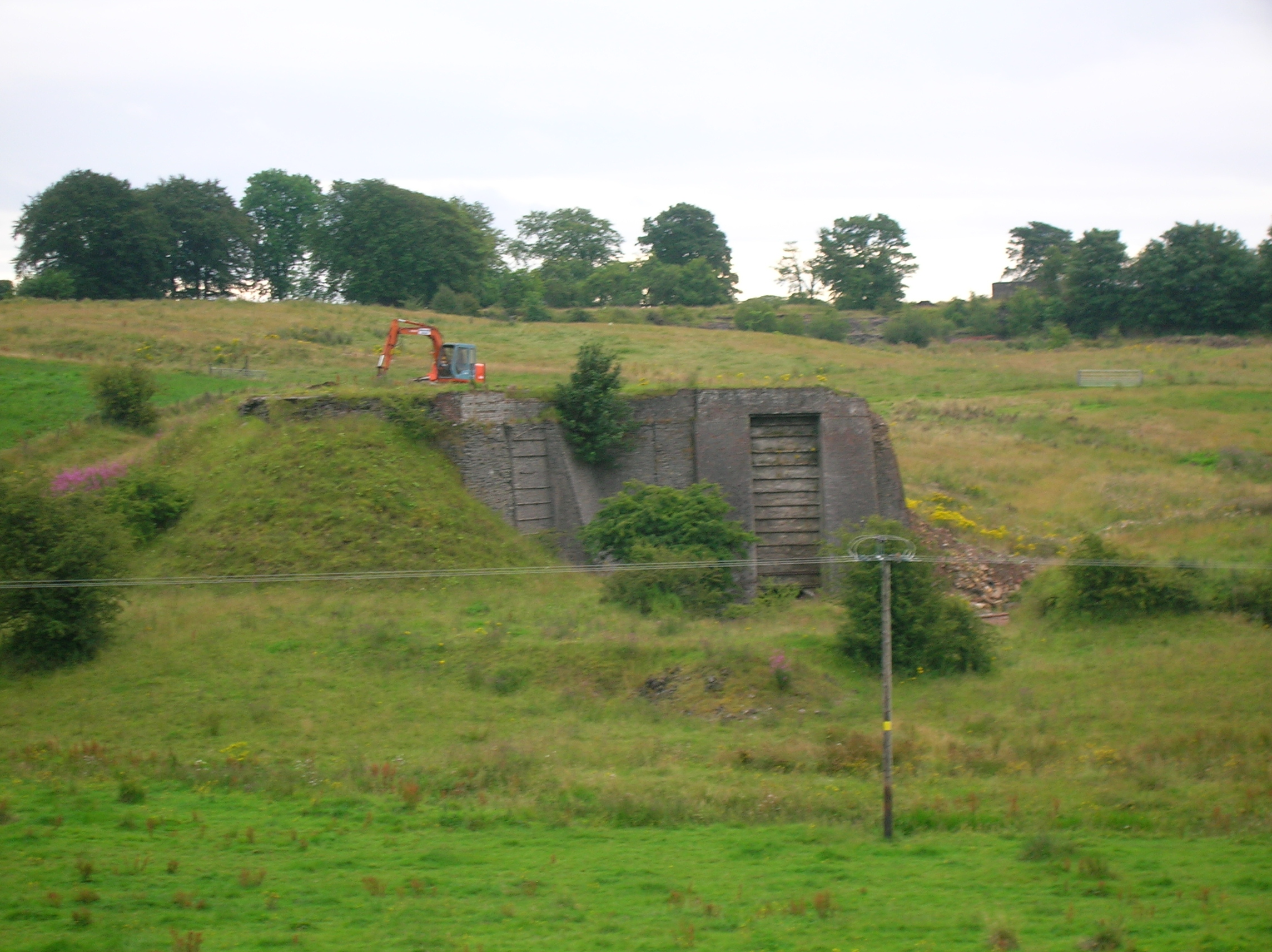
Nettlehirst limekiln and old estate policies on the hill

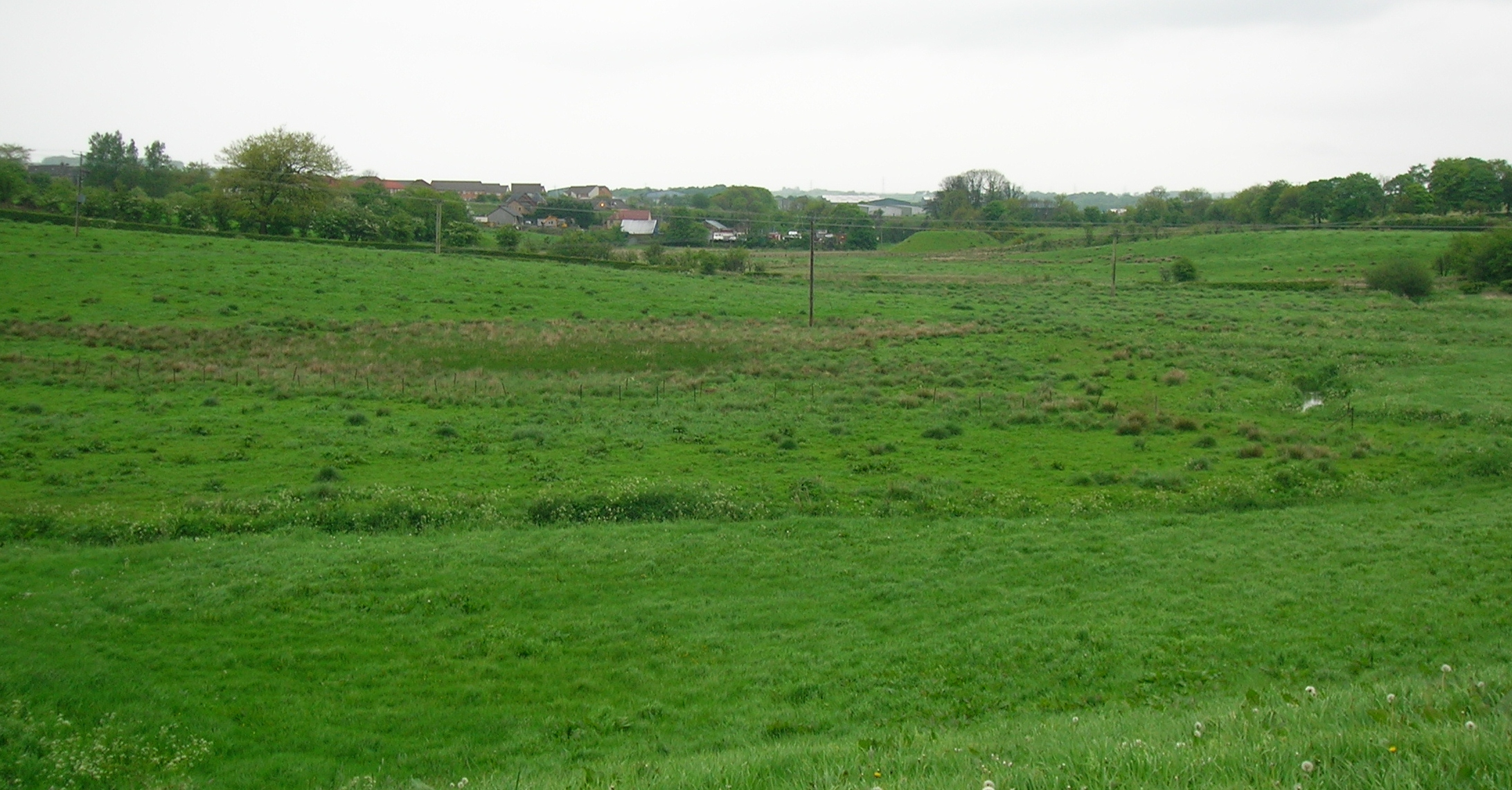
The site of the Black Loch below Nettlehirst

A confusing number of properties in the area are known as Nettlehirst, some distinctions being made by adding 'cottage' or the owners name, such as Reid Nettlehirst. The origin of the placename itself is unknown; however, the 'Nettle' may refer to the plant and 'Hurst' may refer to harvest, meaning an area where nettles predominate. The term 'hairst' might refer to a barren hillock, knoll, or ridge. A fitting description of the site today. There was an old village called Nettlehirst which appears on old maps.
