= Whipsaw =

Type of saw used in a saw pit

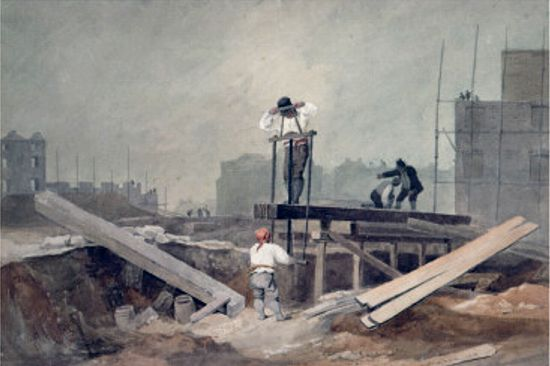
'The Sawpit' by Luke Clennell

A whipsaw or pitsaw was originally a type of saw used in a saw pit, and consisted of a narrow blade held rigid by a frame and called a frame saw or sash saw (see illustrations). This evolved into a straight, stiff blade without a frame, up to 14 feet long and with a handle at each end. The upper handle was called the tiller and the lower one the box, so called from its appearance and because it could be removed when the saw was taken out of one cut to be positioned in another. The whipsaw was used close to the felling site to reduce large logs to beams and planks.

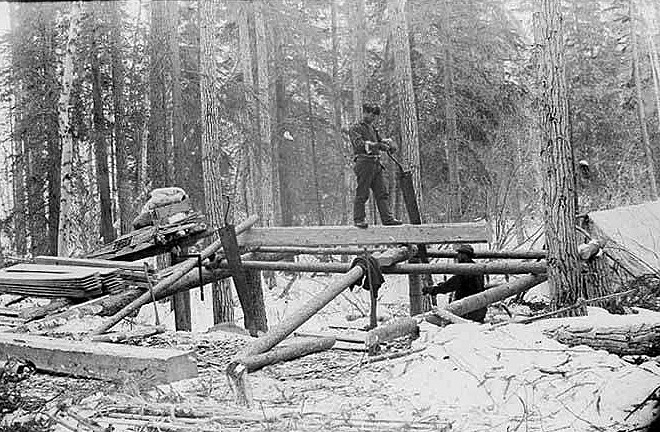
Whipsawing for boatbuilding in Alaska, late 19th century

Sawyers either dug a large pit or constructed a sturdy platform, enabling a two-man crew to saw, one positioned below the log called the pit-man, the other standing on top called the top-man. The saw blade teeth were angled and sharpened as a rip saw so as to only cut on the downward stroke. On the return stroke, the burden of lifting the weight of the saw was shared equally by the two sawyers, thereby reducing fatigue and backache. The pitman had to contend with sawdust in his mouth and eyes and the risk of being crushed by a falling log, although modern photographs show the saw dust falling, as would be expected, away from the pitman, the teeth being on the opposite edge from him.

== Gallery ==
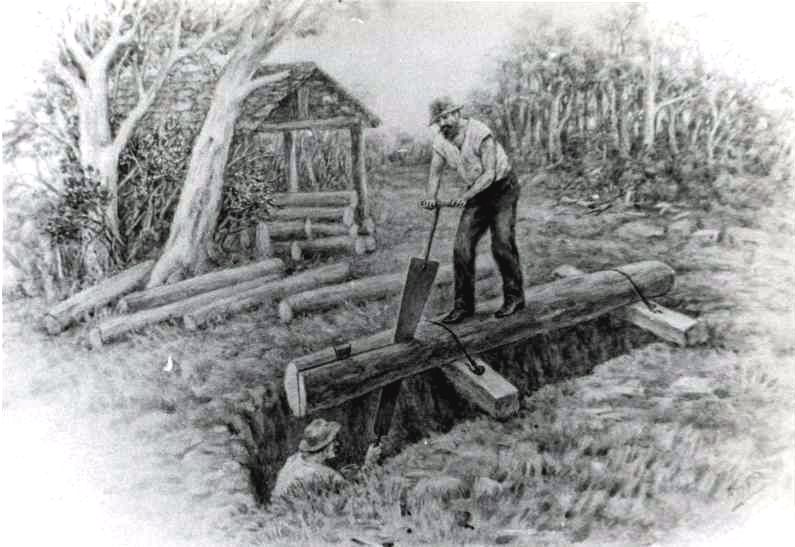
Woodcut showing work above a saw pit

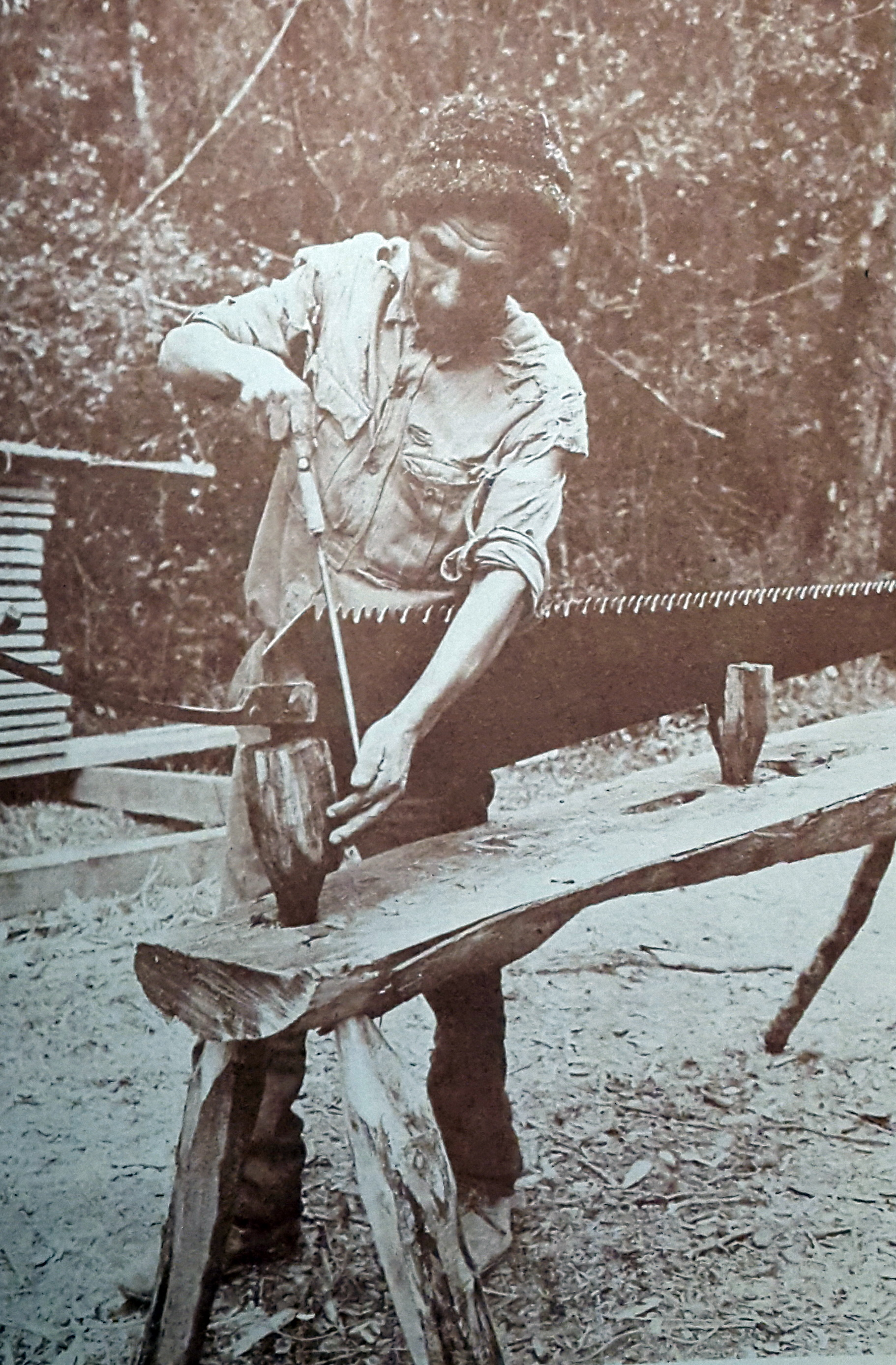
Pitsaw being sharpened

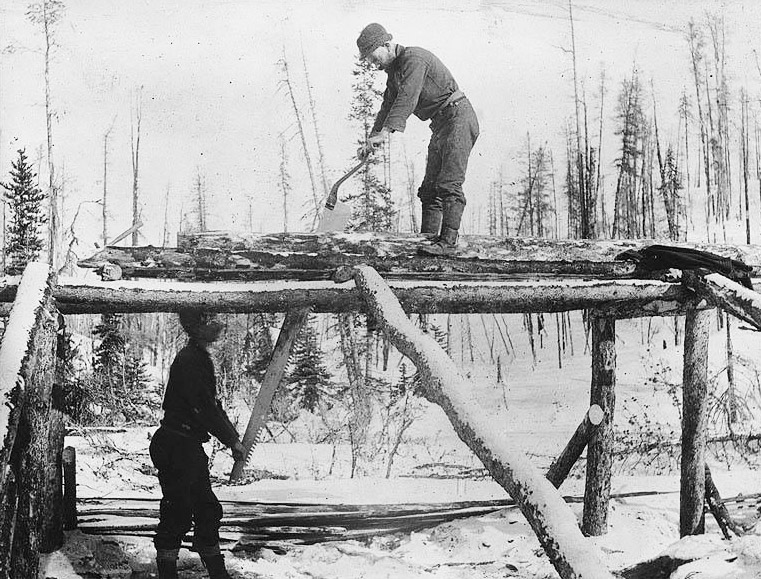
Two men sawing lumber with a pitsaw, the log on trestles rather than over a saw pit

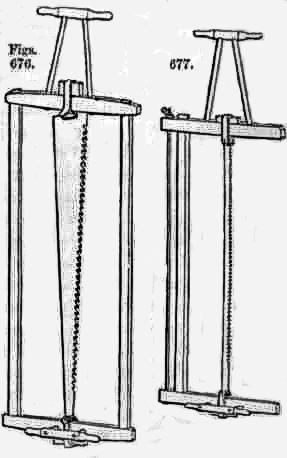
Two types of hand-powered frame or sash saws

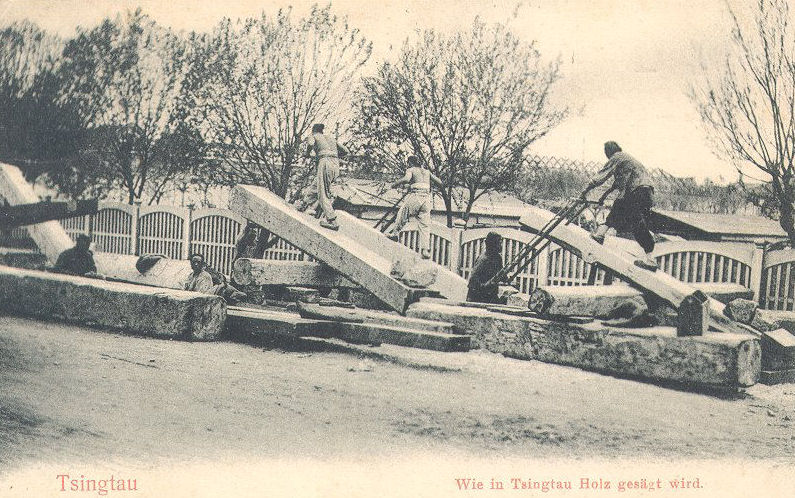
A postcard of Chinese sawyers using frame saws around 1900. This method does not need a saw pit.

== See also ==
- Two-man saw
