= Saw pit =

Pit over which timber is sawed

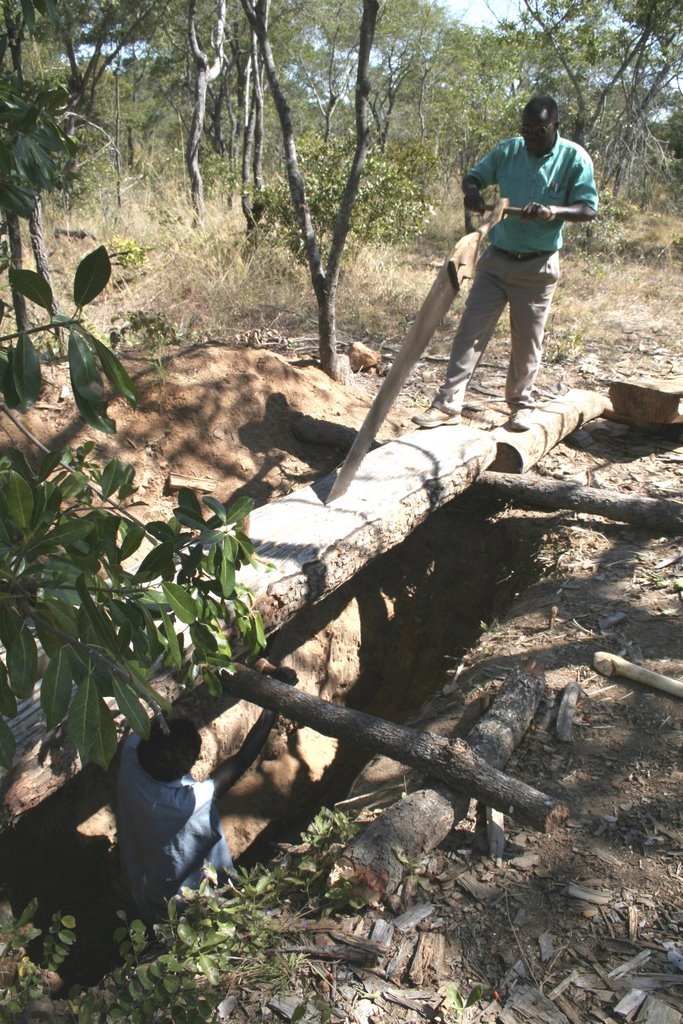
A saw pit in use near Kalomo, Zambia, in 2007

A saw pit or sawpit is a pit over which timber is positioned to be sawed with a long two-handled saw, usually a whipsaw, by two people, one standing above the timber and the other below. It was used for producing sawn planks from tree trunks, which could then be cut down into boards, pales, posts, etc. Many towns, villages and country estates had their own saw pits. The greatest user of sawn timber in past centuries was the shipbuilding industry. After falling, without bark, in smaller and more standardized sizes, and not intended as primary members in shipbuilding, the term 'timber' is often replaced by the term 'lumber'.

== Sawing ==
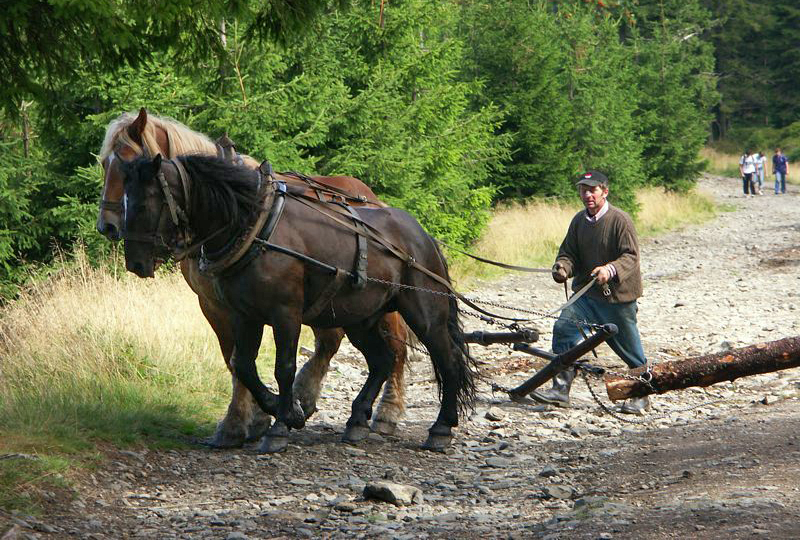
Large logs would usually be hauled to the site by horses.

A sawyer is a person who cuts ("saws") wood for a living. At one time, sawyers were important members of the rural community, because many implements, as well as buildings, were made of wood. In England, the terms used were 'bottom sawyer', for the man standing in the pit, and 'top sawyer', for the man who balanced on the log.

Together, the sawyers would alternate pulling the two-man saw through the log. If the saw kerf began closing, it could cause the saw to bind and increase friction; wedges, most often made of convenient bits of wood, could be inserted in order to keep the kerf open and reduce the friction. Two-man saws were designed to cut in both directions and very careful tooth design was necessary to clear the sawdust during the cut. The sawdust accumulated to the extent that it had to be 'dug out' and removed in a bucket. Oak dust could be burned and used in the curing of bacon.

The two man team would use a two handled saw, called a 'whipsaw', with 'saddleblocks' or 'dogs' to hold the log in position horizontally. Sawing was a slow and exhausting process, requiring strong men with great stamina. The topsawyer had to be especially strong because the saw was pulled in turn by each man, and the lower had the advantage of gravity. The topsawyer also had the important task of guiding the saw so that the board was of even thickness. This was often done by following a chalkline. In some cases, the box handle on one end of the saw could be removed so the saw could be pulled free when the sawyers needed to move the timber to a new position.

The top-sawyer's work had to be very accurate; it was he who kept a careful balance on the log and guided the long saw, who kept the cuts straight or curved as required, and who estimated the width of the planks. He was the man in charge of the operation, and it wasn't uncommon for nicknames such as 'William Top-sawyer' to be common currency in country areas.

Saw pits were a crucial component of shipbuilding, for which planks of wood were necessary for the construction of all classes of vessels. The logs of wood to be sawn were placed over a pit on planks of wood called "dogs" in naval jargon. The senior sawyer stood on top of the plank. The junior one had to go into the pit, which was often partially filled with water, with sawdust constantly 'raining down,' so he stood in a layer of sawdust as a result. One theory of the origin of the terms 'top dog' and 'underdog' is that they come from saw pit work practices (however, others cite documentary evidence that these terms more likely arose from dog fighting). Cutting from underneath a suspended log is sometimes called "underbucking".

Ten foot logs were sometimes sawn into boards except for about the last two inches. In this way, the boards could be more easily handled; then the boards were separated by cutting off the end of the log.

Up to 200 boards a day could be produced with water-driven power sawing, compared to the 12 or so a day by two men in a saw pit. A saw pit could, if circumstances demanded, be worked by a single person, with the end of the saw being weighted with a stone or some other weight, and then raised and lowered by the sawyer.

=== Views of the Kennox estate saw pit ===
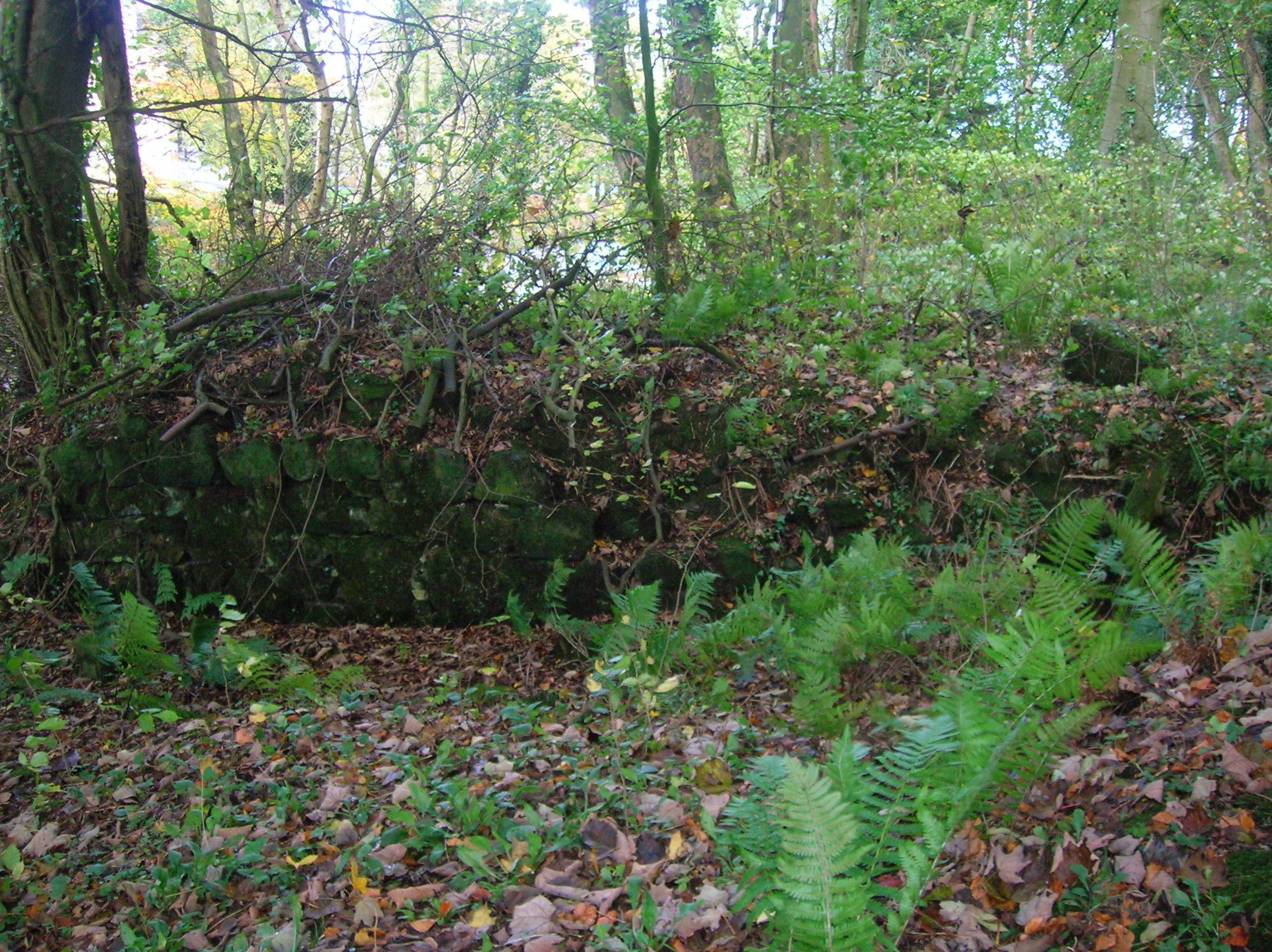
The main surviving retaining wall of the pit with the collapsed wall in the foreground

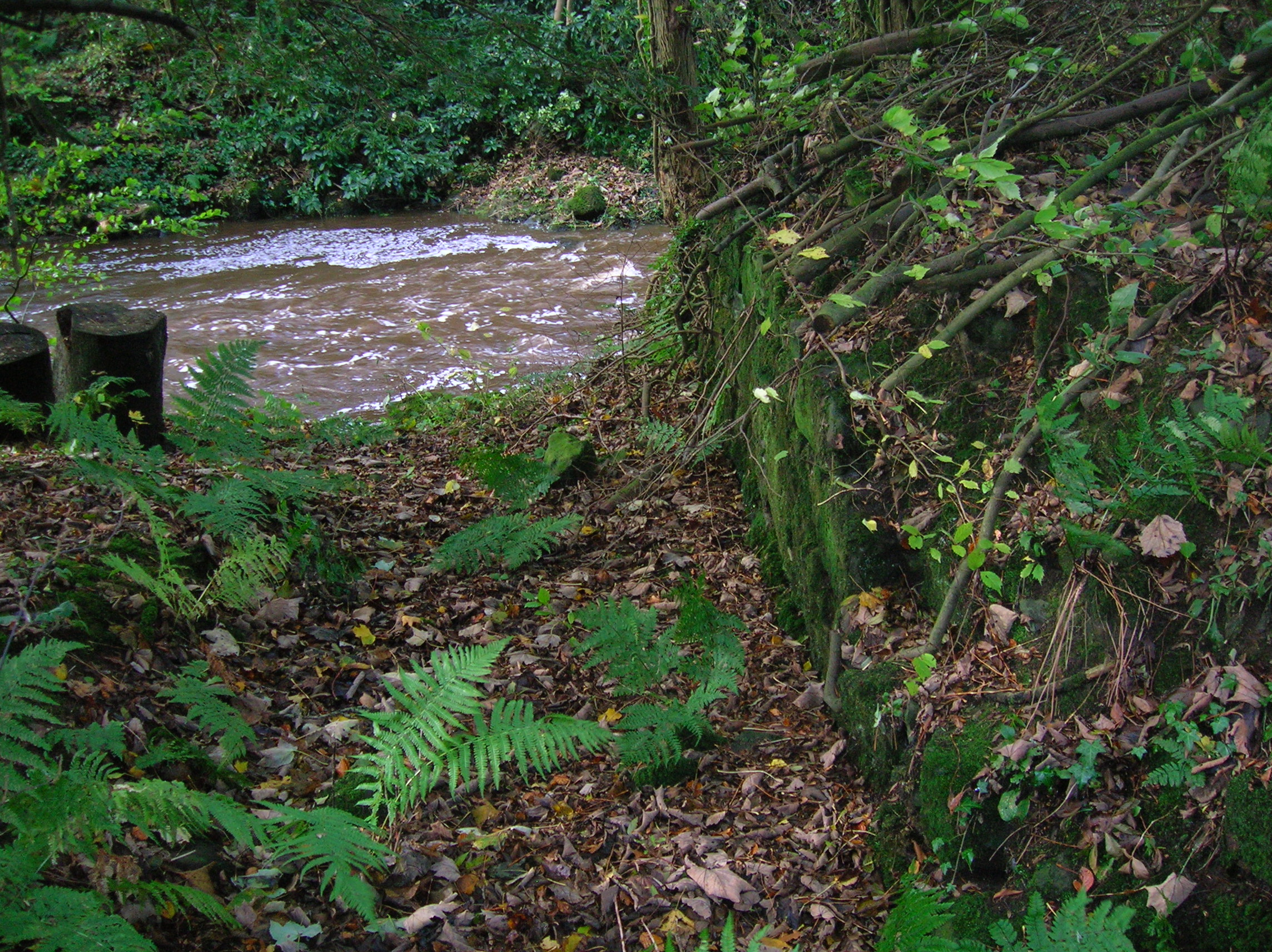
Looking along the pit towards the Glazert Water

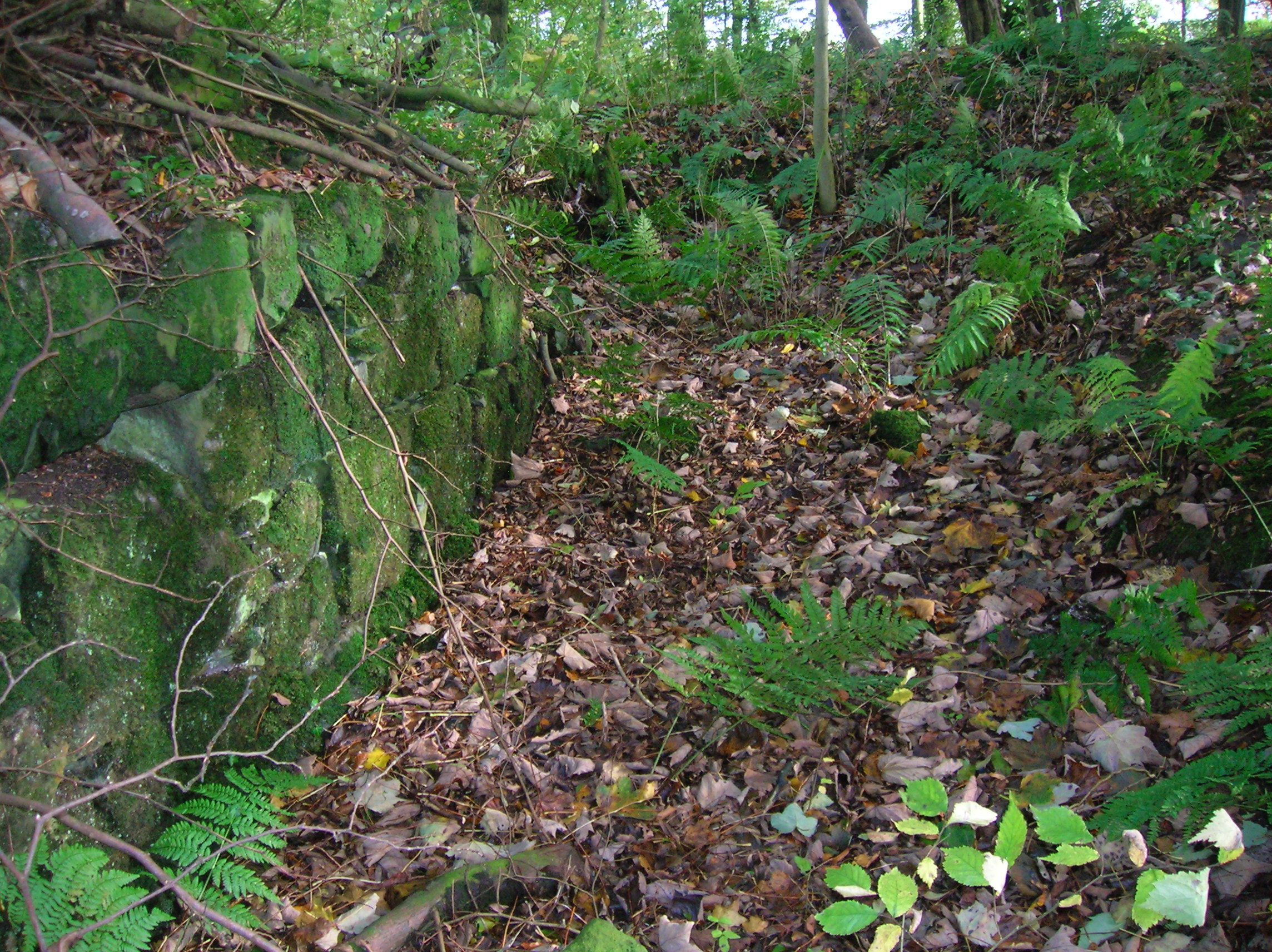
Looking up the pit towards the 'closed off' end

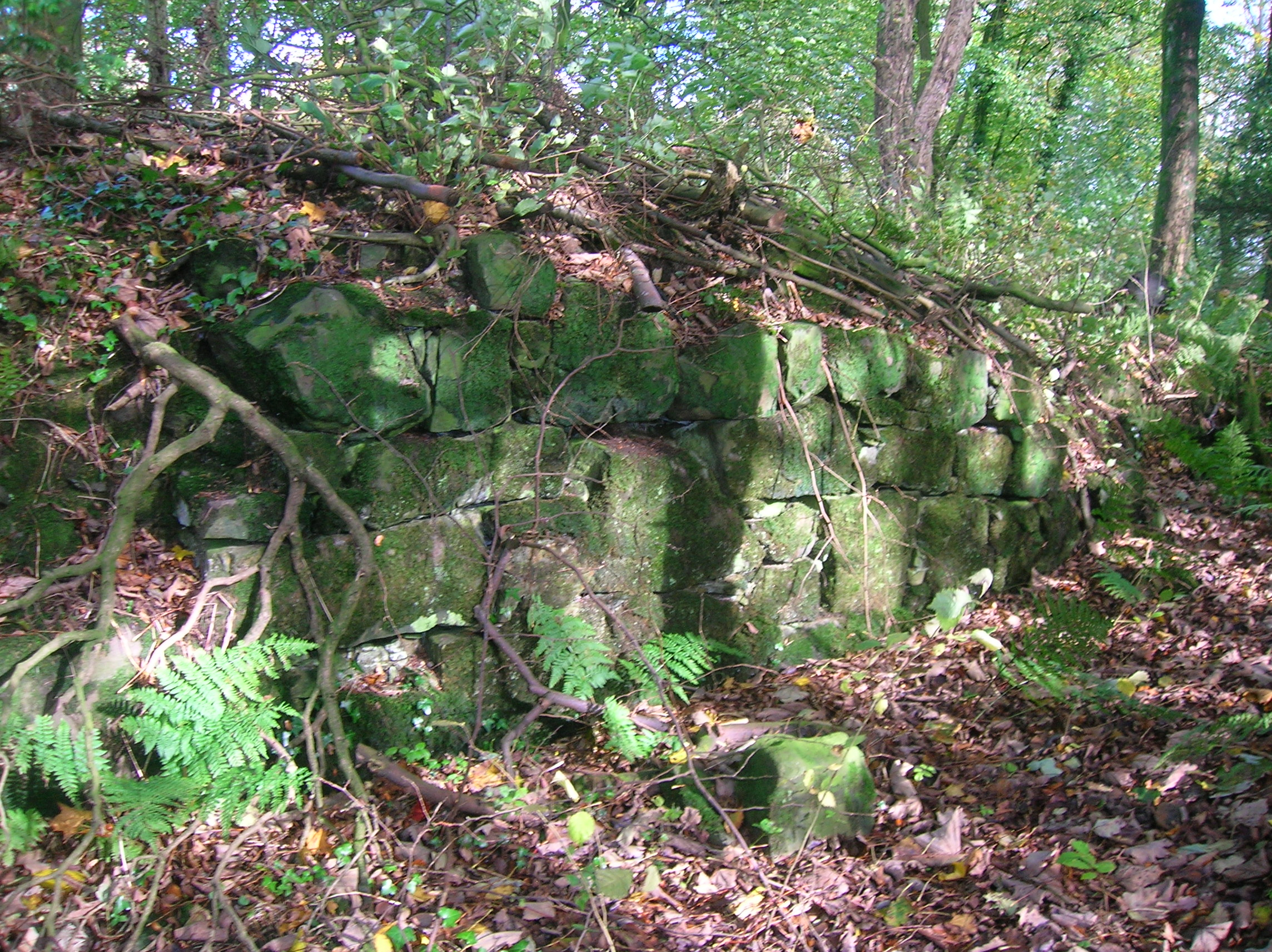
Detail of the stonework on the surviving retaining wall

== History of the saw pit ==
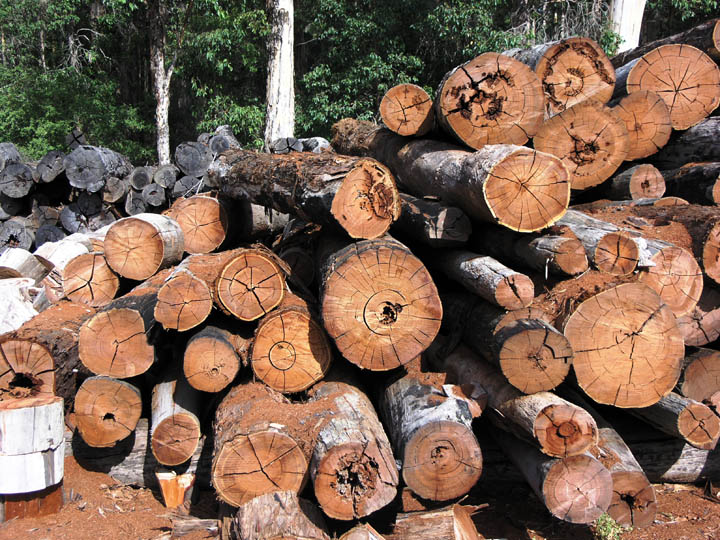
Tree trunks ready for sawing.

A very early water driven Roman sawmill was in use in Hierapolis, the Hierapolis sawmill. Sawmills may well have been developed in the medieval period, as one was sketched by Villard de Honnecourt in c. 1250. There are claims that they were introduced to Madeira following its discovery in c. 1420 and spread widely in Europe in the 16th century.

The 'modern' sawmill was invented or perfected by the Dutchman Cornelis Corneliszoon (1550–1607) who applied a pitman arm onto a wind mill, which converted a turning motion into an up-an-down sawing motion. Cornelis took out a patent on his sawmill on 15 December 1593, and on the pitman arm device on 6 December 1597. Early sawmills adapted the whipsaw to mechanical power, generally driven by a water wheel. The circular motion of the wheel was changed to back-and-forth motion of the saw blade by the pitman arm or rod. A pitman is similar to a conrod, but in reverse (a conrod converts back-and-forth motion to circular motion).

Several early sawmills in England were burned by sawyers who were fearful of losing their livelihoods. However, the increased efficiency of the sawmill, and the back-breaking nature of the saw pit work, resulted in saw pits generally going out of use in the United Kingdom at the time of the industrial revolution. Old OS maps circa 1860 often show the location of saw pits, but by the start of the 20th century very few remained and most are no longer in use. Roy Underhill tells the tall tale, or tongue-in-cheek story, that, after the development of steam-powered sawing machines, saw pits were unnecessary, and therefore were cut up and sold as post-holes.

== The Royal Dockyards ==
Saw pits were introduced into the Royal Dockyards of Britain in the mid 18th century. Before their introduction, trestles were used to support the log, and a frame saw employed for the cutting. In the Royal Dockyards saw pits, the upper sawyer was called the 'Topman;' he followed the marked line to make a straight plank, and the 'Underman' pushed the rib, pit or whip saw. The logs were held firmly in place by G-shaped clamps called 'dogs' that were hammered into the log being cut. The pits were usually lined with elm wood, which withstood damp. Access to the saw pit was via steps or a ladder at one end. The sawyers were paid by the 100 foot runs, with pay related to the difficulty of sawing the wood, oak being the highest paid. Usually the sawyer was responsible for sharpening the saws, however on occasion a whet man was employed to do that work.

== Around the world ==
=== Australia ===
Saw pits provided much of the sawn timber for Australia during the 1800s. Convicts were put to work in saw pits as a punishment in penal colonies in Tasmania.

Saw pits also featured in some of the most significant events of early European Australian settlement. In August 1788, William Bligh captain of HMS Bounty, anchored in Adventure Bay, Tasmania and ordered his crew to dig a saw pit in order to repair their boat. Eight months later the crew would go on to mutiny in the famous Mutiny on the Bounty.

In January 1788, the first British fleet sailed into Botany Bay, then Sydney Cove to settle Sydney. Saw pits were promptly dug in both places so building timber could be produced.

=== New Zealand ===
Saw pits were prominent in the early European logging of New Zealand. Even with the introduction of water-powered sawmills in the 1840s, and steam-powered sawmills in 1865, saw pits were still being used in the early 1900s in difficult locations.

Nineteenth century pit sawyers in New Zealand were well paid; during the 1840s in Nelson, a sawyer could earn 80 pounds in five months, more than double the average wage at the time.

== Micro history ==
The saw pit at Llanaeron Home Farm is unusually housed in a single-story open-fronted building. The rear wall is of rubble (stone) construction and there is a rubble pier at each of the front corners, with the whole structure under a pitched slate roof.

Q-pits, used to make White coal, are often found nearby saw pits.

William Shakespeare refers to saw pits in the Merry Wives of Windsor. Daniel Defoe's character, the 17th century castaway Robinson Crusoe, complains about how difficult it is to saw timber into planks without the use of a saw pit.

Philip Wharton was born in 1613, and at the age of 12 (1625) he became the fourth Lord Wharton. In 1642 Lord Wharton raised a regiment of foot soldiers and a troop of horsemen to fight in the Battle of Edgehill. They behaved less than gloriously - "Before there were any near excuse three or four of our regiments fairly ran away - Sir William Fairfax's, Sir Henry Cholmley's, my Lord Kimbolton's and to say the plain truth my own." Wharton himself ran away and is said to have hidden in a saw pit, thus earning for himself the parliamentary nickname of Philip 'Sawpit' Wharton.

The settlement of Saw Pit in the United States of America eventually outgrew this name and became Port Chester by incorporating as a village in 1868. The Town of Sawpit, Colorado is a statutory town located in San Miguel County, Colorado, United States of America.

== Sites of old saw pits ==
England

- Brede High Farm, East Sussex. Over 30 saw pits have been found in the woods.
- Cotehele, Cornwall. Preserved by the National Trust in working order.
- Elvet, County Durham.
- Haltwhistle, Northumberland. A saw pit is located beside the Haltwhistle burn.
- Haswell, County Durham.
- Kibblesworth, County Durham.
- Little Lumley, County Durham.
- Quarrington, County Durham. A saw pit near Quarrington Hall.
- Marble Head, Restronguet Point, near Falmouth, Cornwall. There is a trench there - now stone-clad - which is thought to have once been the site of a saw pit, but this has not been confirmed.
- Singleton, Chichester, West Sussex. A covered saw pit at the Weald and Downland Museum.

Scotland

- Broomhill, map reference: NH 611 516; Parish of Knockbain in the Highland Council area.
- Cadham, map reference: NO 3298 7240; Parish of Cortachy and Clova in Angus Council area.
- Charlie's Sike, map reference: NY 4805 8770; Parish of Castleton in Scottish Borders Council area.
- Kennox estate, map reference: NS 386 448; Parish of Dreghorn in the North Ayrshire Council area. 55.6698°N 4.5666°W
- Kirkton Muir, map reference: NH 602 435, Parish of Kirkhill in the Highland Council area.
- Nettlehirst near Barrmill in North Ayrshire had a saw pit close to the house in 1856.
- Pennyseorach, map reference: NR 7127 0778; Parish of Southend in Argyll And Bute Council area.
- Strathallan Wood, map reference: NN 9420 1797, Parish of Trinity Gask in Perth And Kinross. Two parallel grass-grown hollows mark the site of a disused saw pit on the edge of a forestry plantation 950 m ESE of Raith farmstead (NN91 NW61). They are set about 1 m apart.
- Woolforddyke, map reference: NT 0075 5590; Parish of Carnwath in South Lanarkshire Council area. The visible remains are of an oval pit, measuring 2 m by 1.6 m across and 0.4 m in depth, situated within a shelter belt.
