= Sawyer (occupation) =

Someone who saws wood, particularly using a pitsaw

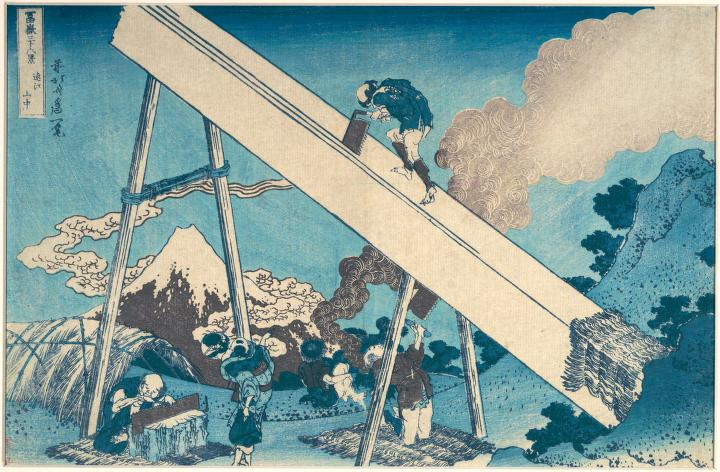
Sawyers in Japan, circa 1800. Nishiki-e print after Katsushika Hokusai.

Sawyer also known as sawmill worker is an occupational term referring to someone who saws wood, particularly using a pitsaw either in a saw pit or with the log on trestles above ground or operates a sawmill. One such job is the occupation of someone who cuts lumber to length for the consumer market, a task now often done by end users or at lumber and home improvement stores.

The term is still widely used in the logging industry to refer to the operator of a chainsaw (or still in some limited applications, a crosscut saw) for harvesting, wildfire suppression, trail construction and related work. In the construction industry, the term is applied to the operator of a concrete saw.

== See also ==
- Hewing
- Wood splitting
