= Q-pit =

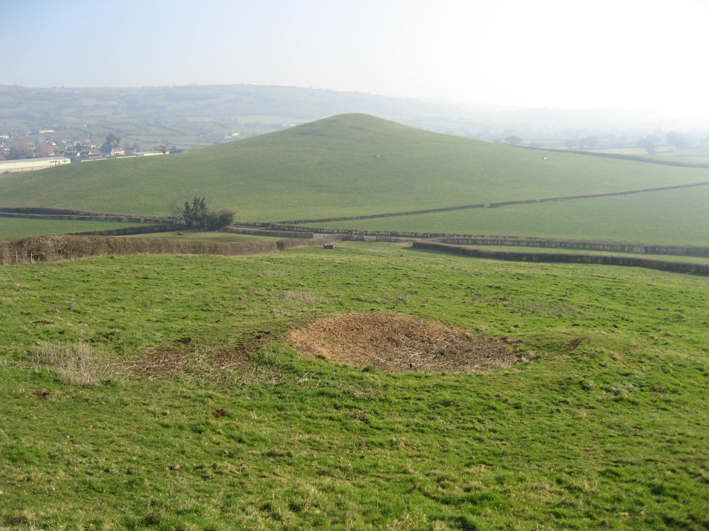
View looking eastwards from Lodge Hill towards Windmill Hill with the Q-pit in the foreground and the Mendip Hills in the background.

Q-pits are kiln sites which were dug for the production of white coal prior to the Industrial Revolution when white coal was largely superseded by the use of coke.

== Purpose ==
The white coal produced in Q-pits was largely used in the smelting of lead from about 1550 to 1750, when a process was discovered that used coal. The large sections of white coal had previously been mixed with charcoal to give the right temperature, as charcoal alone was too hot and would have volatilised the lead. Some evidence exists to suggest that some had a secondary use in the charking of coal into coke.

== Location ==
Many Q-pits were located in deciduous woodlands and as such they are an important landscape feature indicating both previous industrial activity and the presence of a woodland at the site or nearby. The pits are often found in association with saw pits.

== Construction ==
The pits were created by removing soil to create a depression about 12–13 feet (4m) in diameter, breached by a 'spout' and thus forming a 'Q' shape. The pits were dug from the end of the Middle Ages up to around 1760, the start of the Industrial Revolution. Potash pits were of a similar shape and size, however, they were used to make potash for use in coursing or degreasing wool and were once found in sheep rearing areas.

== Geographical location ==
The pits are a common feature in lead mining districts such as the Leadhills in Scotland and East Derbyshire. Due to their small size, they are not likely to be confused with quarries, although bomb craters from World War II can occasionally lead the landscape historian astray.

In 2007 an isolated example was identified and excavated in Westbury-sub-Mendip near the lead smelting areas on the Mendip Hills in Somerset. Over 200 such pits have been surveyed in Ecclesall Woods, Sheffield.
