= White coal =

Dried chopped wood used as fuel

White coal is a form of fuel produced by drying chopped wood over a fire. It differs from charcoal which is carbonised wood. White coal was used in England to melt lead ore from the mid-sixteenth to the late seventeenth centuries. It produces more heat than green wood but less than charcoal and thus prevents the lead evaporating. White coal could be used mixed with charcoal for other industrial uses than lead smelting. White coal was produced in distinctive circular pits with a channel, known as Q-pits. They are frequently found in the woods of South Yorkshire.

== Resources ==
Although traditionally made by drying chopped wood, white coal can be made from numerous waste products, most of which are formed into briquettes. Raw materials which can be used include:

- Groundnut shells
- Cotton hulls and stalks
- Castor seed shells
- Forest leaves; wood chips and shavings
- Sugarcane bagasse
- Rice husk and paddy straw
- Mustard waste
- Coir dust
- Coffee husk
- Sunflower waste
- Maize stalks
- Bajra (pearl millet) cobs
- Sesame seeds oil cake
- Wheat straw

== Production ==
=== India ===
India is fast becoming a major manufacturer and consumer of white coal. A large number of companies have switched their boiler fuels to use white coal instead of fossil fuels. White coal manufacturing capacity is increasing in the state of Gujarat, Maharashtra, Tamil Nadu and Rajasthan. The production of white coal (briquettes made of biomass) using agricultural and forest waste is more common in North India.

== Benefits ==
Producers of white coal proclaim the following benefits from using the fuel:

- White coal is cheaper than coal and fire wood.
- There is minimal sulphur in the white coal, therefore no toxic gases.
- Moisture content is nil.
- Biomass briquettes have a higher practical thermal value.
- Briquettes have consistent quality, have high burning efficiency, and are ideally sized for complete combustion.
- Combustion is more uniform compared to coal and boiler response to changes in steam requirements is faster, due to higher quantity of volatile matter in briquettes.
- Low ash contents.
- The calorific value of the finished briquettes is approximately 3500 to 4000 kcal/kg.

== See also ==
Solid biofuels
