= Wooden box =

Box made of wood

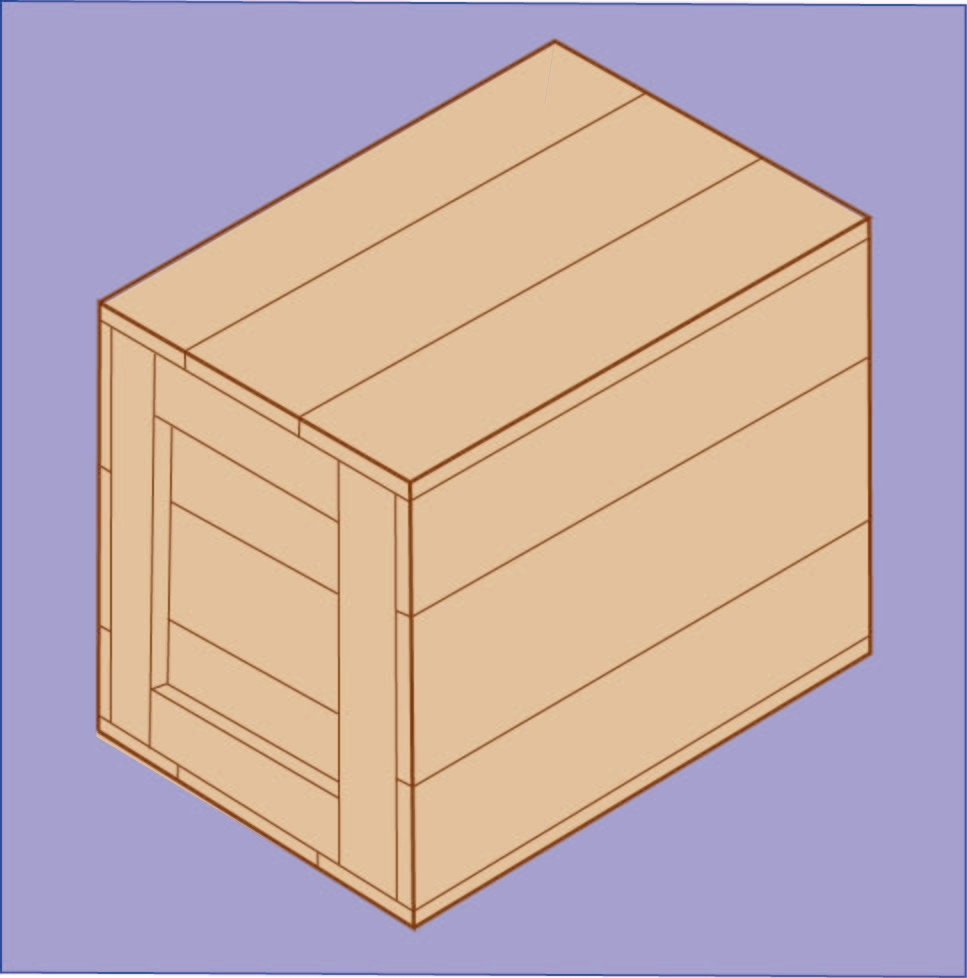
Wooden box with full cleated ends (Style 2)

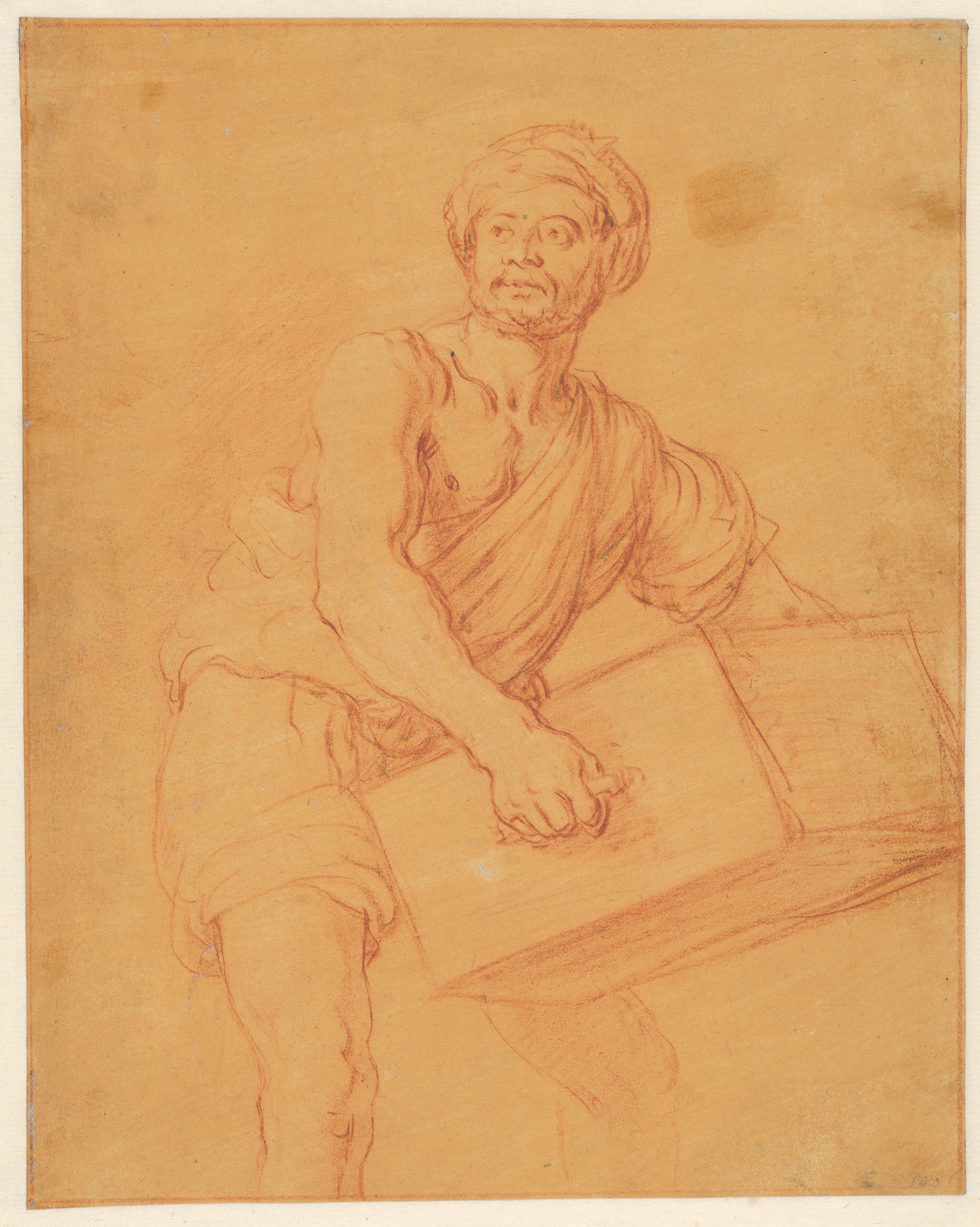
Man with wooden box or chest, 1625

A wooden box is a container made of wood for storage or as a shipping container.

Construction may include several types of wood; lumber (timber), plywood, engineered woods, etc. For some purposes, decorative woods are used.

== Boxes as shipping containers ==
Wooden boxes are often used for heavy duty packaging when

- high strength is needed for heavy and difficult loads
- long term warehousing may be needed
- large size is required
- rigidity is required
- when stacking strength is critical

Boxes and crates are not the same. If the sheathing of the container (plywood, lumber, etc.) can be removed, and a framed structure will remain standing, the container would likely be termed a crate. If removal of the sheathing resulted in there being no way of fastening the lumber around the edges of the container, the container would likely be termed a wooden box.

The strength of a wooden box is rated based on the weight it can carry before the cap (top, ends, and sides) is installed. "Skids" or thick bottom runners, are sometimes specified to allow forklift trucks access for lifting.

Performance is strongly influenced by the specific design, type of wood, type of fasteners (nails, etc.), workmanship, etc.

Some boxes have handles, hand holes, or hand holds.

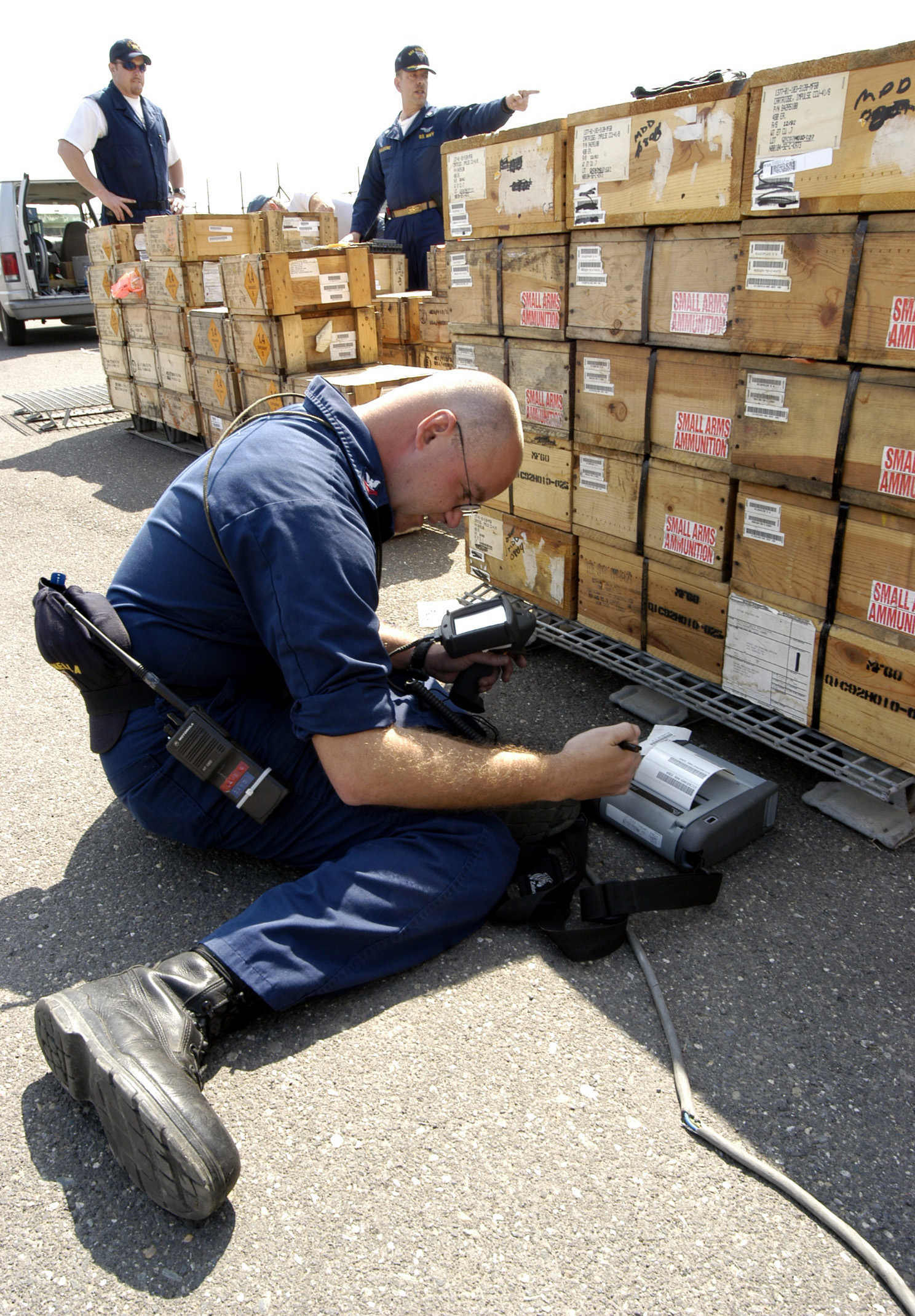
Ammunition in wooden boxes, steel strapping

== Nailed wood box ==
=== Cleated box ===
A cleated box has five or six panel faces with wood strips attached to them. The panels can be made of plywood, solid or corrugated fiberboard, etc. Wooden cleats reinforce the panels.

=== Wirebound box ===
Very thin lumber is used for a wirebound box. Wires are stapled or stitched to the girth and to wood cleats. These are sometimes used for produce and for heavy loose items for military or export use. These are lighter than wood boxes or crates. They have excellent tensile strength to contain items but not much stacking strength.

=== Skid box ===
A skid box is a wood, corrugated fiberboard, or metal box attached to a heavy duty pallet or platform on a skid (parallel wood runners)

== See also ==
- Band saw box
- Box compression test
- ISPM 15 Regulations explain requirements for international shipping of wood boxes, crates, or pallets.
