= Tathata Golf =

Golf instruction company

- Genre: Golf
- Founded: 2010
- Founder: Bryan Hepler
- Headquarters: Scottsdale, Arizona, USA
- Website: www.TathataGolf.com

Tathata Golf (pronounced ta·tha·ta), is a global golf instruction and education brand headquartered in Scottsdale, Arizona, United States. The company offers online streaming golf training programs, in which golfers can train without going to the course. The Tathata Golf curriculum combines martial arts teachings with the fundamental movements of the greatest golfers and athletes in the world.

== History and timeline ==
Founded in 2010, Developer and Founder Bryan Hepler set out to create a standardized curriculum for the game of golf, based on the movements of many golfers in the World Golf Hall of Game. The sole purpose was to break down the key barriers to golf's enjoyment and improvement; time, expense and difficulty. Tathata Golf launched the flagship product, the 60-Day Training Program in 2015. Early in 2016, Tathata Golf launched their Certified Movement Specialist Program, a program to certified golf professionals, yoga teachers and personal trainers the ability to teach Tathata Golf to students in their locations. In December 2016, Tathata Golf became the preferred training program for the American Junior Golf Association. For the past seven years, Tathata Golf has gained the support from former tour players and analysts Gary McCord and Brandel Chamblee. The company launched their new online membership in 2017 and has announced additional training programs to be heading to the marketplace in late 2018.
