= Splitting band knife =

Industrial power tool

The splitting band knife (or band knife or bandknife) is a kind of knife used in several fields including: tannery, EVA/rubber, foam, cork, shoe and leather goods, paper, carpet and other soft sheet materials. It is a power tool which is very similar in operation to a band saw, with an endless loop blade; the material to be cut is supported by a flat table.

== Technical characteristics ==
A splitting band knife can be produced in different sizes (length x width x thickness) according to the splitting machine on which it has to be fitted. Different technical characteristics define the quality of the product (blade)

The blade can be welded and bevelled, toothed not rectified, rectified on both edge and surfaces, with pre-sharpening made by tools or grinding stones.

A splitting band knife can be produced in several dimensions, usually with a length from 1,000 to 1,500 mm (39 to 59 in), a width between 10 and 110 mm (0.39 and 4.33 in), and a thickness from 0.40 to 1.5 mm (0.016 to 0.059 in).

== Sectors and use ==
=== Tannery sector ===
In the tannery sector the splitting band knife allows to divide/split leather and textile in its thickness. The final products of this operation are Split and Grain (internal and external parts) of the leather.

Blades can be used to split every kind of material which has to be split in the thickness:

- leather
- fur
- non-woven material
- velvet

In the tannery sector, splitting band knives can be used in following working: wet blue, lime, dry, wet white and other tannings.

The blades which are mostly used in this sector are rectified on both edge and surfaces in order to guarantee the best splitting, that means a constance in the thickness of the leather that is produced/split (rectification of surfaces), and also to guarantee the maximum linearity during the splitting process ( back edge); the blade must run as stable as possible without oscillations at all, which could create defects on the leather. Moreover, blades are used to be provided pre-bevelled in order to save time to start the blade running up once it is fitted on the splitting machine.

=== Rubber, cork and foam sectors ===
In the fields of rubber and cork, splitting band knives can be used on every kind of material that needs to be split in the thickness such as:

- rubber (except vulcanized rubbers)
- cork
- foam

In this sector blades can be used according to their application, to the splitting machine, to the material and to the cut/split precision required by the final product.

=== Shoes and leather goods sectors ===
In the production linked to shoes and leather goods, the splitting band knives allow to divide/split and equalize or “reduce” the leather in the thickness in order to improve the quality of the finished product.

The final product of this working, equalization or “reduction” is a leather ready to become a shoe or leather goods (for example bags, wallets, belts, etc..) The hides used in this sectors are always finished leathers and in dry.

In this field, splitting band knives can be used on every kind of material that needs to be split in the thickness such as:

- leather
- textiles – linings
- rubber – insoles
- cardboard components

The blades which are mostly used in this sector are rectified on both edge and surfaces in order to guarantee the best splitting, that means a constance in the thickness of the leather that is produced/split (rectification of surfaces), and also to guarantee the maximum linearity during the splitting process ( back edge); the blade must run as stable as possible without oscillations at all, which could create defects on the leather. Moreover, blades are used to be provided pre-bevelled in order to save time to start the blade running up once it is fitted on the splitting machine.

=== Paper sector ===
The splitting band knife can be used also in paper sector and allows to divide/to split the material in the thickness, for example paper reels (from toilet paper to the reels for industrial use, paper towel rolls for domestic use, etc..)

In this production, the final product obtained by the splitting is:

- paper for industrial sector: big rolls, reels, etc.. for hygienic uses: handkerchiefs, toilet paper, kitchen rolls

In this sector blades can be used according to their application, to the splitting machine, to the material and to the cut/split precision required by the final product

== Band knife machines ==
Band Knife blades are used on two types of machine (vertical and horizontal) depending on the material being cut/processed.

=== Vertical ===
On a vertical band knife machine usually a narrow width band knife blade is used, the most common width being 10 mm (0.39 in). The length of the band knife blade depends on the supplier of the band knife machine. The dimensions are indicated on a small metal tag pasted or riveted on the machine. The vertical machine band knife blade is most commonly a "double bevel, double edge DBDE" execution to enable cutting while advancing the table and also while retracting the work table, while as the "double bevel, single edge DBSE" execution cuts only in one direction. Productivity is enhanced when the operator cuts both while advancing and also while retracting the work table after adjusting the foam block after each pass for cutting. The DBDE execution blade can have a parallel or twisted 180 degrees welding. The twisted welding execution saves a grinding unit, as both edges pass the same grinding unit after two turns. It has been observed that a narrow width on a vertical band knife machine gives better dimensional accuracies on the foam block. The wider the vertical machine band knife - more the deflection and size variation from one end to the other extreme end.

=== Horizontal ===
Horizontal band knife blades are wider usually 30–60 mm (1.2–2.4 in) wide for foam converting is popular, for leather goods 40–50 mm (1.6–2.0 in) wide blade is popular, 85–110 mm (3.3–4.3 in) width is popular for the tannery splitting band knife. There are other widths depending on the machine manufacturer. The horizontal machine band knife blade is supported by a guide to give dimensional accuracies while cutting/splitting. Therefore, only blades that have passed as one main manufacturing step a surface grinding process reach the necessary thickness tolerances of less than 0.02 mm (0.00079 in). A higher tolerance would lead to marks on the surface of the split material like leather or rubber. Blades are available in different grades of exactness depending on the required exactness on the material to be cut/split. On modern machines in combination with a high grade blade a splitting thickness of 0.2 mm (0.0079 in) for 1,500 mm (59 in) material width is possible.

== Blade sharpening ==
For both the vertical and horizontal band knife machines there is a grinding attachment which continuously sharpens the band knife while it is cutting. It is possible to find a non powered grinding attachment for the vertical machines but for the horizontal band knife machine the grinding attachment for continuously sharpening the blade is powered by electric motors.

== Safety Standards ==
European Committee for Standardization (CEN) developed EN 13112 emphasizing identification and mitigation of risks including:

Mechanical hazards
contact with moving blades, entanglement, crushing, and shearing.
Operational hazards
during cleaning, adjustment, or maintenance.
Material hazards
dust, particles, or chemical residues from processed materials.

== History ==
- 1808 W. Newberry patent No. 3105 London, including "machinery for ... splitting skins"
- 1854 J.F. Flanders and J.A. Marden with a patent for a bandknife machine
- 1912: Foundation of blade manufacturer Rudolf Alber

Before WW II: several machinery brands on the market: Turner, Clasen, USM, BMD,

- 2011: Known Polish pneumatic lifting table manufacturer REXEL started producing Vertical Band knife machines. At the moment there are models: R1250, R1150, R1000, R750, R500 (The number e.g. 1000 is the arm length in cm).

== Images ==
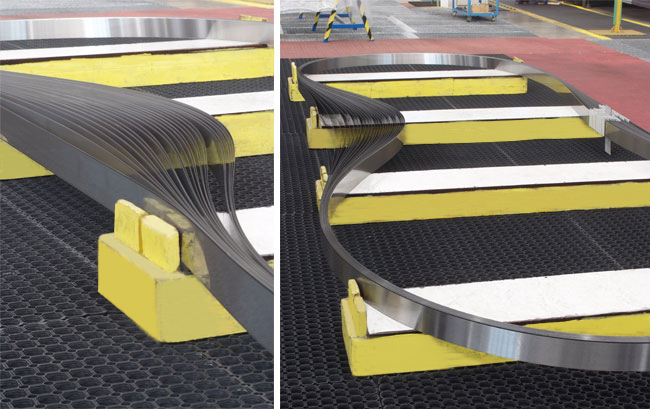
Splitting band knives for tannery sector, tested before packing

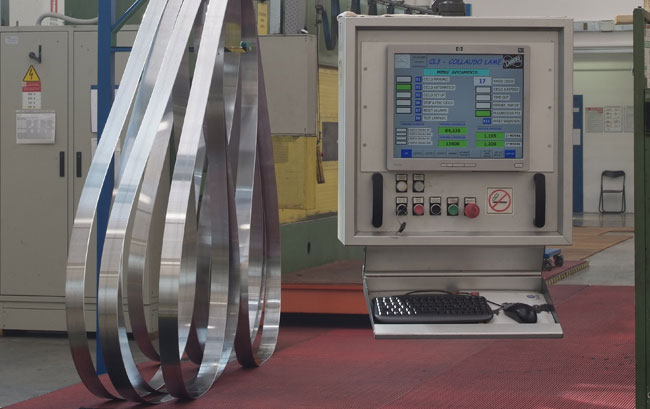
testing phase of splitting band knives

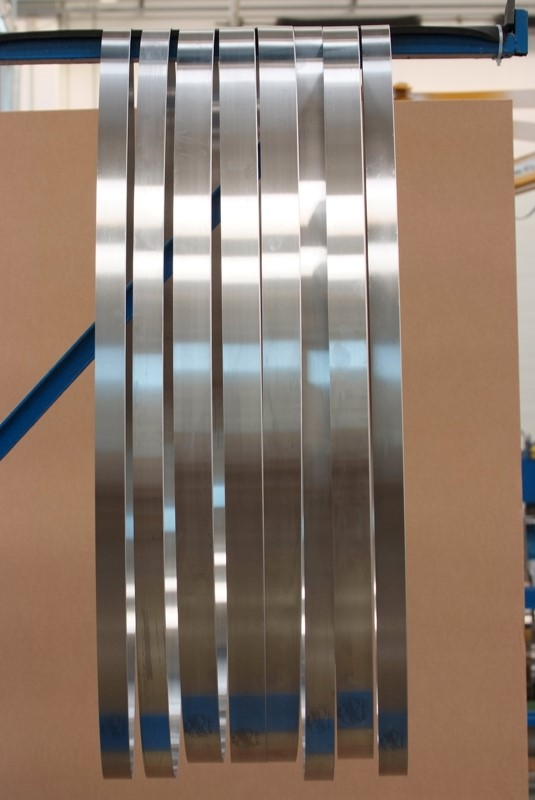
Splitting band knives

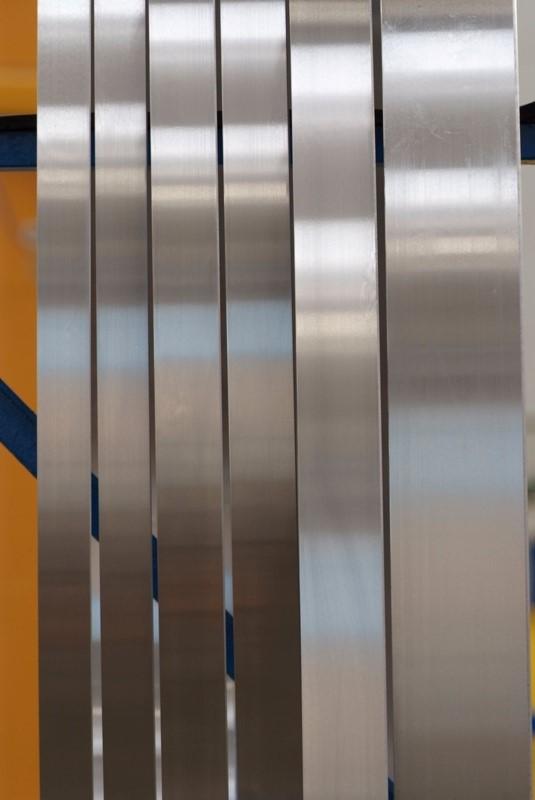
splitting band knife
