= World Golf Teachers Federation =

Golf instruction umbrella organisation

The World Golf Teachers Federation (WGTF) is the umbrella body of various golf teaching federations around the world. Founded in 1993 as a collaboration between the United States Golf Teachers Federation and Europe, the WGTF has expanded to include 41 member federations. The WGTF provides an international standard for the training and certification of golf teaching professionals, and is the largest organization of golf teaching professionals worldwide.

== World Golf Teachers Cup ==
The World Golf Teachers Cup is the world championship event of the World Golf Teachers Federation. Since 2001, it has been played biennially in different locations around the world. Prior to 2001, it was an annual event. Competition consists of both team and individual championships.

=== Past team champions ===
- 2019 United States
- 2017 United States
- 2015 Brazil
- 2013 China
- 2011 United States
- 2009 United States
- 2007 Caribbean
- 2005 Paraguay
- 2003 United States
- 2001 United States
- 2000 United States
- 1999 United States
- 1998 United States
- 1997 United States

=== Past individual champions ===
- 2019 Mark Harman
- 2017 Shafiq Masih
- 2015 Rebecca Samuelsson
- 2013 Makoto Kitagawa
- 2011 James Douris
- 2009 Luis Menezes
- 2007 Christopher Richards
- 2005 Raul Fretes
- 2003 David Belling
- 2001 Henrik Jentsch
- 2000 Doug Borland
- 1999 Ken Butler
- 1998 Mark Harman
- 1997 Mark Harman
