= Golf instruction =

Training in golfing rules and skills

Golf instruction is the art of equipping and training golfers to play better golf through improved awareness of swing cause and effects as a result of the actions by their body, the club, and their effect on the golf ball. Many exceptional golfers share several key traits that contribute to their success. These include having a clear intent, achieving consistent swings that align with their goals, and developing a high degree of automaticity to ensure enduring enjoyment of the game.

== Required skills ==
Golf instruction consists of five primary skills: shots from a tee (most notable: driving that uses a driver), full shots from the ground (mostly known as "iron shots", pitching (or 3/4 shots designed for distance control, chipping (short shots around the green the require less than a full swing), putting (1 club preferably "the putter") and course strategy or gamesmanship. Proficiency in teaching golf instruction requires not only technical and physical ability, but also knowledge of the rules and etiquette of the game. Golf instruction offered on many platforms in the United States including: the PGA of America, GolfTEC, and independent golfers who "may" or "may not" have credentials that are recognized by credible teachers certified sources such as the PGA of America. Although there are many great golf instructors in the United States who are PGA Class A Professionals, not all great instructors carry this status nor find it a major determiner of golf instruction proficiency.

== Forms of instruction ==
Golf instruction can be wide-ranging, but many modern instructors work to identify specific issues in a golfer's swing and offer methods intended to help the golfer develop a consistent, repeatable swing. Common elements included in this process are:

1. Visual feedback through video and bio motion analysis
2. Personalized golf club fitting for individual body and swing types
3. On-course play under real conditions
4. Mental performance development
5. Golf specific body conditioning for optimal golf bio-mechanics

Beginning players can start lesson in several ways, but most do so in either a group or individual setting, covering the five primary skills of golf as noted above golf swing. Golf is an asymmetrical exercise that can break body balances, requiring also adequate exercises to keep the balance in muscles. Experienced recreational players often return for instruction, either to fix a specific problem they are encountering or to improve their game. Reconstruction of a golf swing to reach a high level of play often involves series of lessons over an extended period of time. Junior golfers often begin receiving instruction by age 10 or younger, and often retain private teachers even when coached on a high school golf team.

== Notable instructors ==
Some top instructors who work with professional golfers have become quite well known in their own right over the years, including Harvey Penick, Jack Grout, Dick Harmon, David Leadbetter, Butch Harmon, Gary Wiren, Hank Haney, Chip Thomson, Sean Foley, Quentin Patterson and Mike Bennett and Andy Plummer. Some of the teachers maintain teaching facilities or schools where they or their disciples use their methods or systems. A few instructors focus solely on a particular aspect of the sport, such as Dave Pelz with the short game. Some famous golfers have been tightly bound with their instructor, such as Jack Nicklaus with Jack Grout, while in other cases golfers have made high-profile switches from one instructor to another, such as Tiger Woods moving from Butch Harmon to various other instructors.

Golf instruction may be augmented by training aids such as specially weighting or jointed clubs, putting cups for practice on the den room carpet, mini practice tees with feedback for use in garages, et cetera. Some training aids are sold via television infomercials and the more peculiar varieties were satirized in the 1996 film Tin Cup.

== Publications and media ==
Recreational golfers are constantly seeking tips on how to improve, and the major golf publications such as Golf Magazine and Golf Digest devote substantial portions of their pages to instructional material of various kinds, often written by top-level instructors. Even television broadcasts of professional golf tournaments often contain short instructional segments, delivered by commentators who are also instructors such as Peter Kostis.

== Effectiveness ==
Golf instruction is no guarantee of success or improved play in the game. Bad mechanics can be deeply ingrained in a subject's swing, and psychological factors can also hinder progress. The 2009 Golf Channel program The Haney Project: Charles Barkley showcased some of these issues, as Hank Haney attempted to fix former NBA great Charles Barkley's infamously bad swing.

== See also ==
- World Golf Teachers Federation
