= Coin purse =

Small pouch made for carrying coins

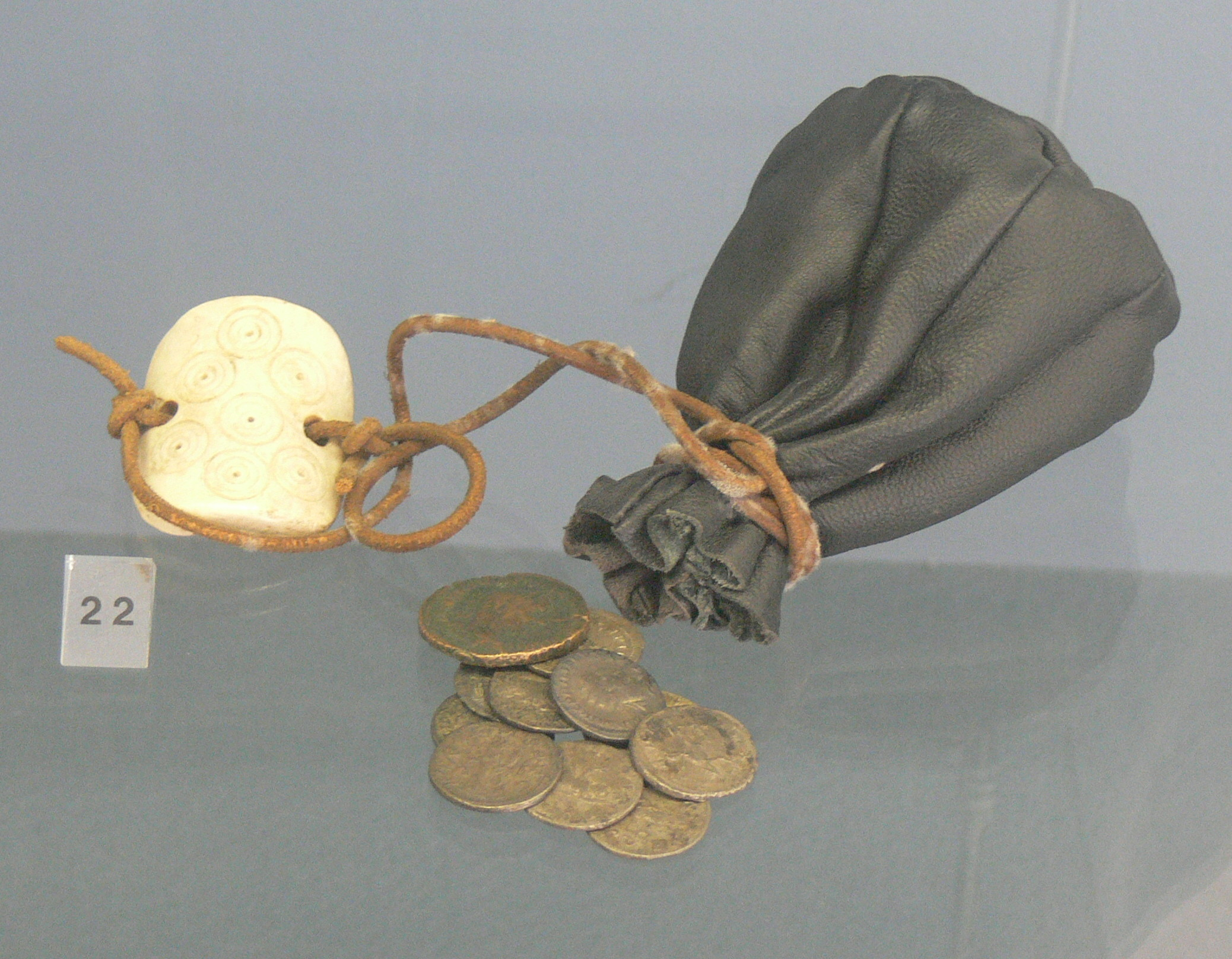
Model of an ancient Roman leather purse

A purse or pouch (from the Latin bursa, which in turn, is from the Greek βύρσα, býrsa, oxhide), sometimes called coin purse for clarity, is a small money bag or pouch, made for carrying coins. In most Commonwealth countries it is known simply as a purse, while "purse" in the United States usually refers to a handbag. An obsolete variant is a porte-monnaie. "Purse" can also be a synonym to bursary (which has the same origin), i.e. a monetary prize in a competition.

== History ==
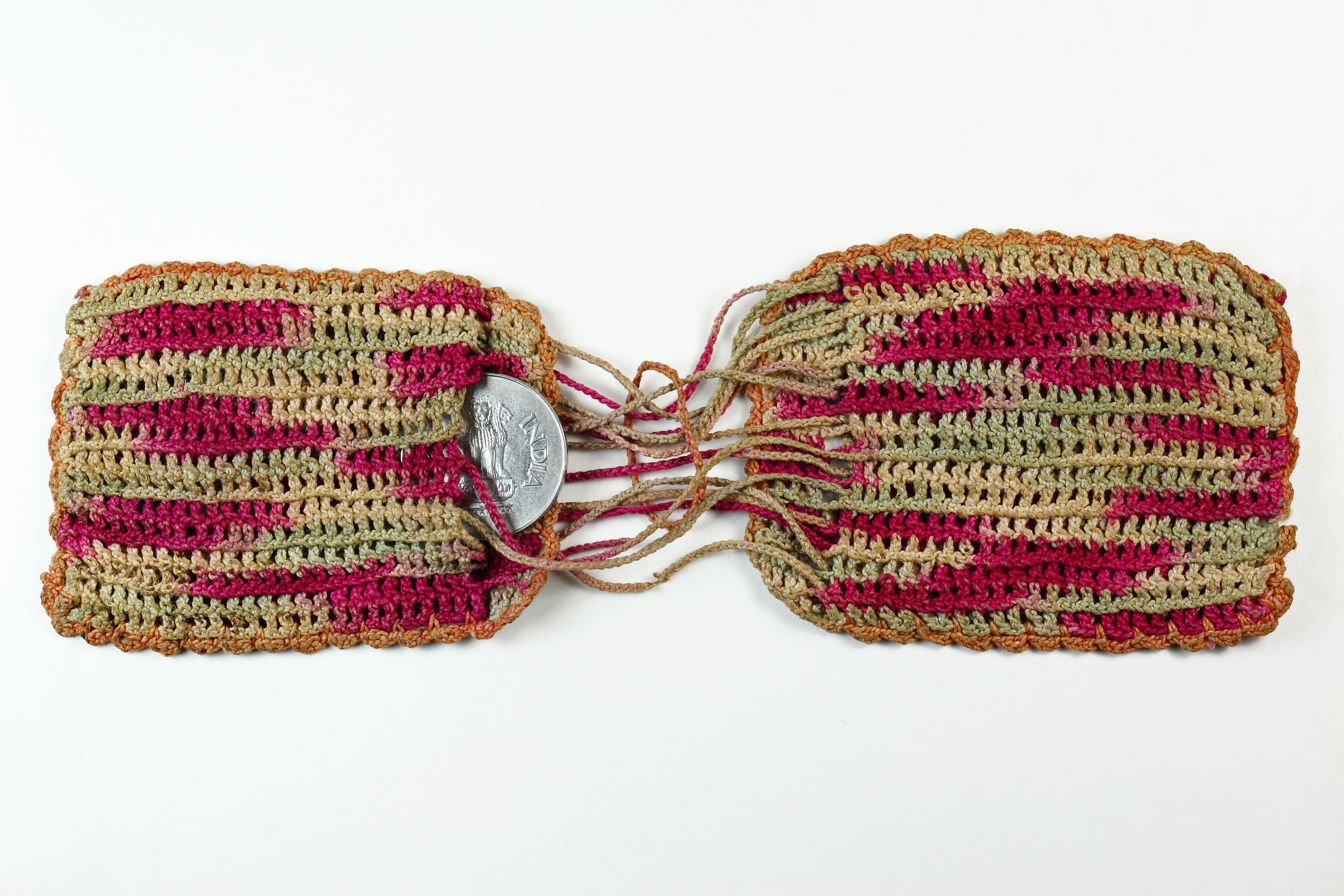
Antique Indian purse, used by women.

The oldest known purse was found with Ötzi the Iceman who lived around 3,300 BC. Another early example is on Egyptian hieroglyphs, which show pouches worn over the shoulder. The purse-lid from the Sutton Hoo burial is a very elaborate, probably royal, metalwork cover for a (presumably) leather Anglo-Saxon purse of about 600 AD. In Europe they often showed social status based on the embroidery and quality of the bag.

In the 15th century, both men and women wore purses. They were often finely embroidered or ornamented with gold. It was also customary for men to give their new brides purses embroidered with an illustration of a love story.

In the 17th century, bags became more complex and elaborate. Girls were taught skills such as embroidery and needlework that could assist them in finding a husband. These skills gave rise to stitched artwork on bags. Around the year 1670, men's breeches were made with built-in pockets, which caused them to stop carrying purses. They did however carry little netted purses in their pocket to carry money.

== See also ==
- Money bag
- Shell purse
- Wallet
