= Shell purse =

Type of purse made from shells

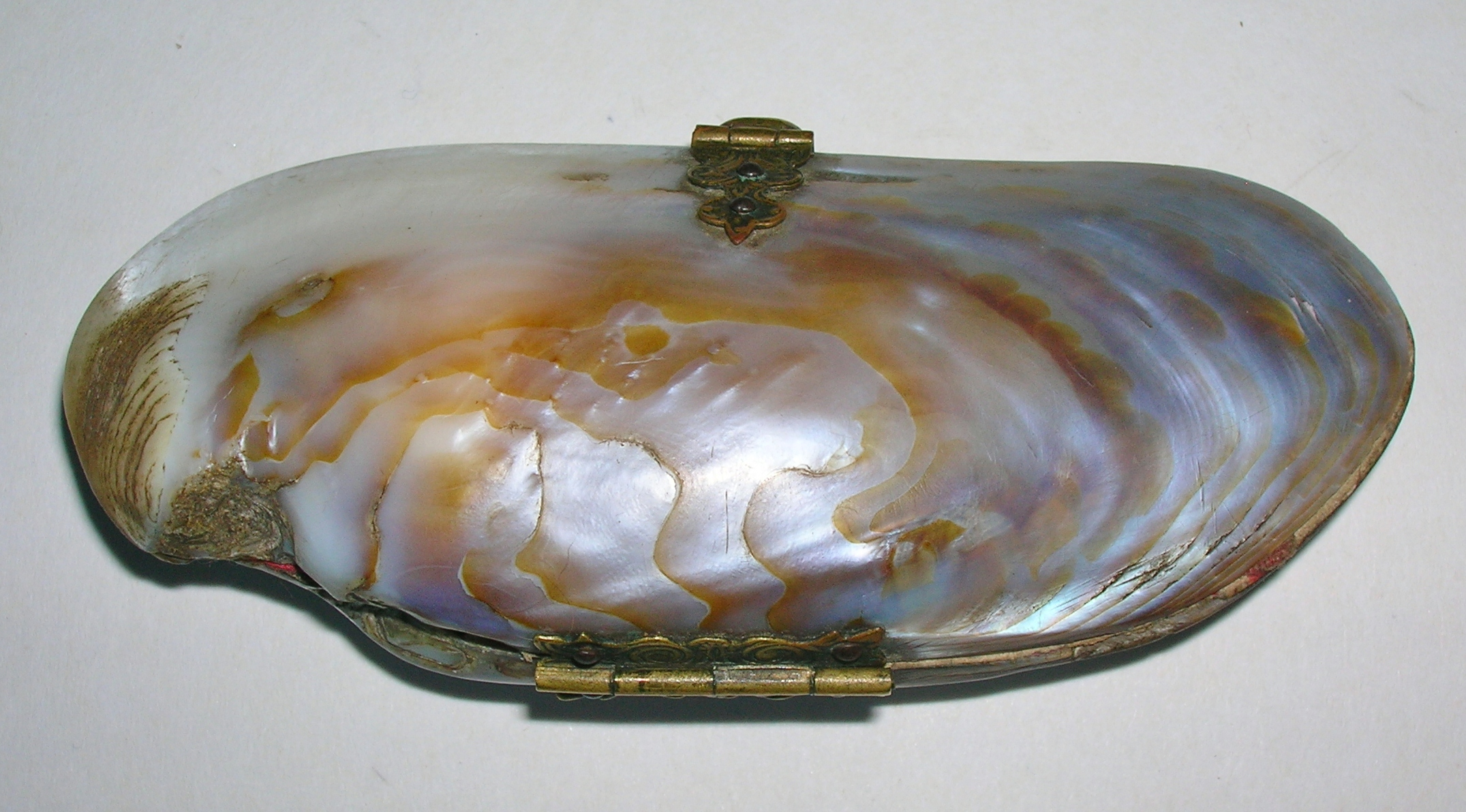
Shell purse made from a freshwater pearl mussel, Margaritifera shell

A shell purse is a type of coin purse that is made from whole or trimmed mollusk shells, especially from bivalve mollusc shells. These purses are of mainly novelty use and purchased as souvenirs of visits, etc. In the past, some were engraved or painted with floral or other decorations, sentimental messages, personal or place names. In many cases there was extra working of the shell, either grinding down and polishing to expose the mother of pearl or filing to form patterns such as criss-cross designs.

== Origins ==
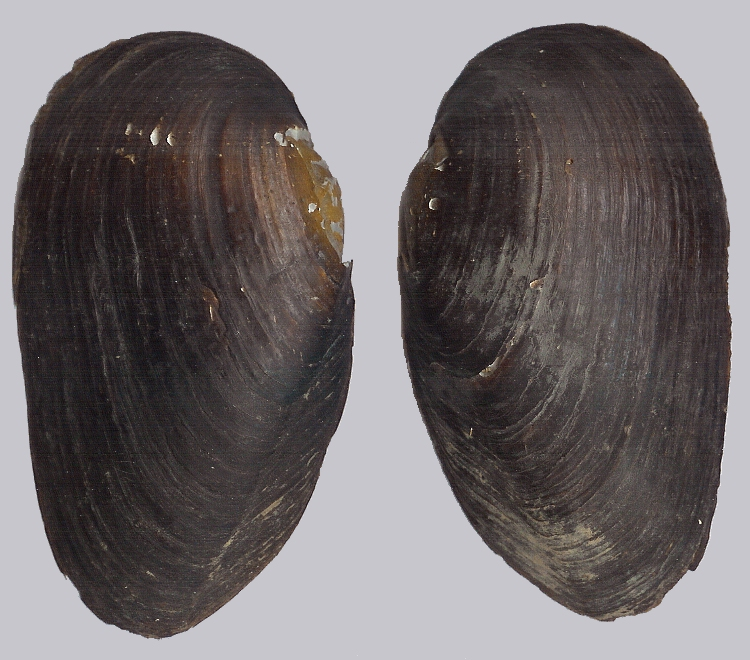
Freshwater Pearl Mussel shell, with its natural periostracum intact

The use of shells as purses mainly dates from the end of the 19th century, when the Victorians love of the natural world and passion for collecting seashells coincided with the middle classes being able to take holidays and make journeys to the seaside on the newly constructed railways. Visitors to seaside resorts often wished to take back souvenirs of their excursions, and shell purses were one of many items produced by entrepreneurial shopkeepers. They have been made in various parts of the world such as the United Kingdom, US, Germany, etc.

== Uses ==
Most shell purses were designed to be carried in a pocket or handbag; however, some were designed as necklaces or small handbags. Being small they could at most be used to hold a few coins such gold sovereigns in Victorian times, pills, keys, or special items such as arrowheads, children's milk teeth, etc. Some were kept as ornaments or keepsakes, as witnessed by the number that have survived in good condition, indicating that they were not in regular use.

== Decoration ==
By carving through the layers of the shell, intricate designs can be created, such as floral decorations, personal names, etc. As stated, some were painted with floral designs, personal names, etc.

== Shell types and designs ==
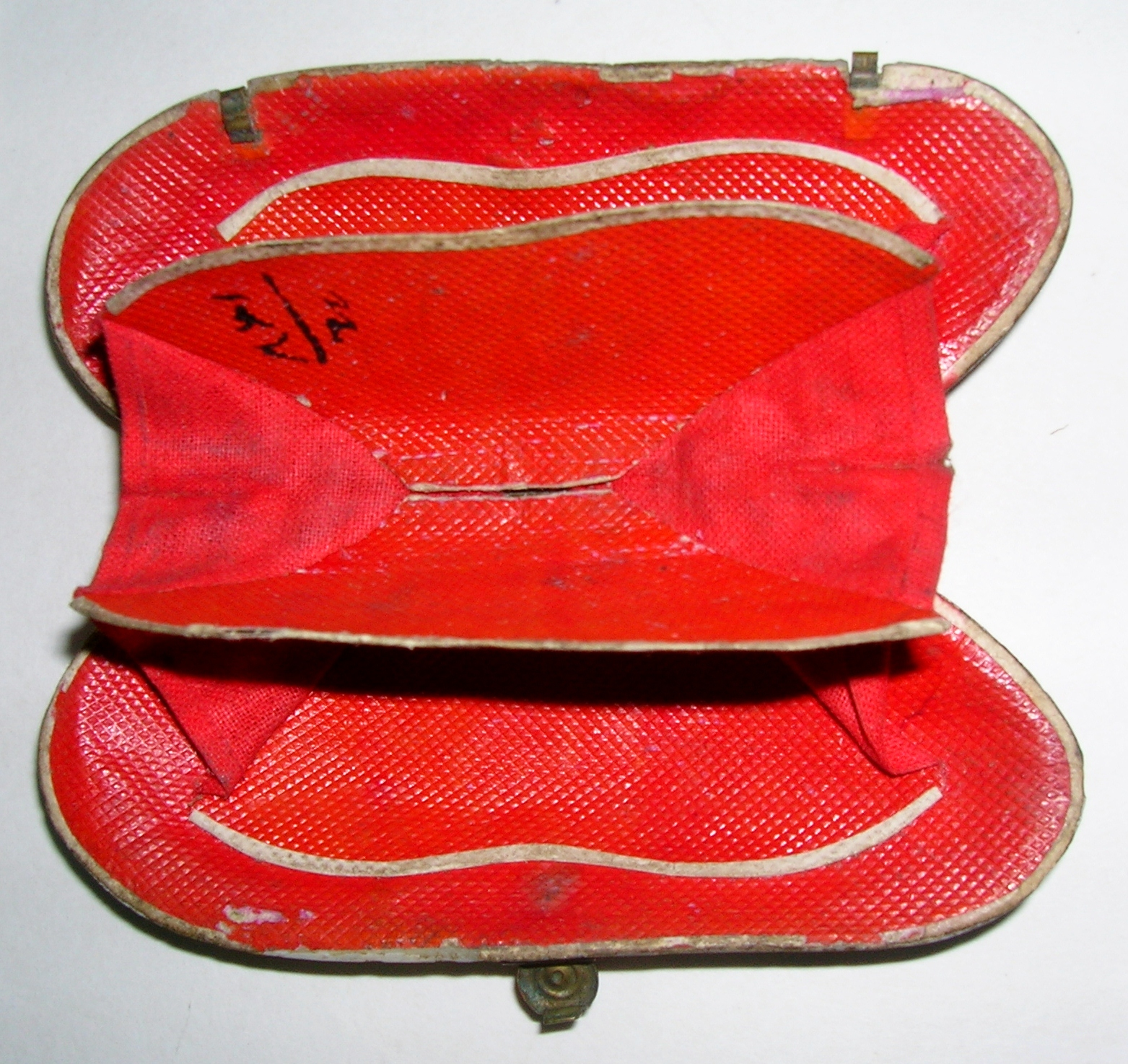
Shark skin accordion lining of a shell purse.

Freshwater mussel shells were often used. Because they are relatively largebivalve the purse could accommodate an interior mechanism such as an accordion to separate coins into different denominations, etc. Shark skin was often used as a liner, dyed appropriately in red, blue, green, etc.

Abalone, various kinds of clams, mussels, limpets and other species of seashells have been used to make shell purses. Identifying the exact species used for any individual purse is often very difficult, especially as the surface layer of the shell was often removed in order to expose the mother of pearl layer (where such a layer was present), or was ground and polished in order to show brighter colors.

Shell purses were sometimes attached to a necklace, or had short chains attached that effectively made them into miniature handbags. Various clasps were used, secure by necessity, such as the 'kissing' type.

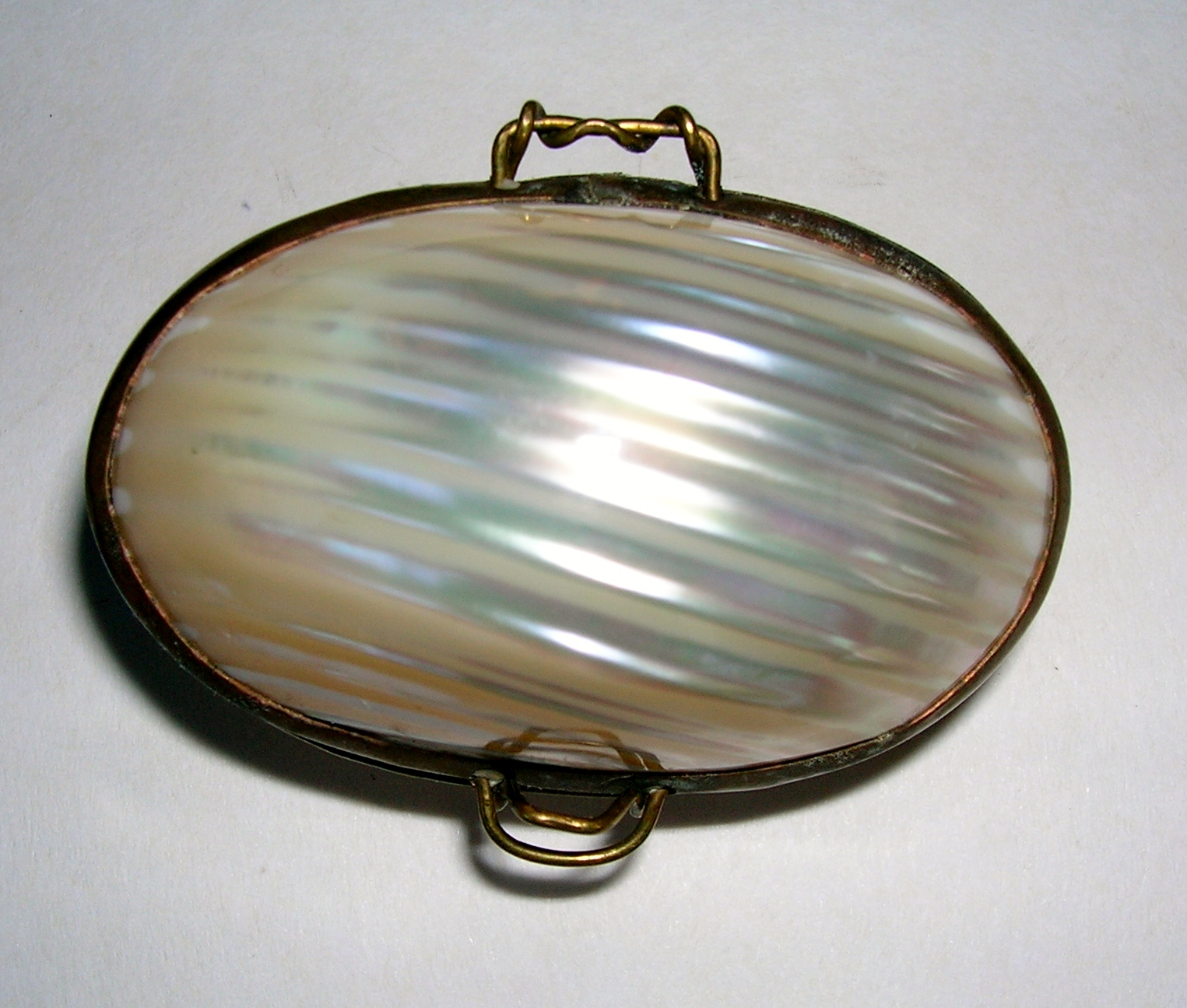
Small shell purse

Modern examples are sometimes sold as 'Mermaid's Purses'.

== Similar artifacts ==
Some hinged containers made out of shells were sold as sewing kits, but they are very similar in appearance to shell purses. Snuff boxes were also sometimes made from bivalve shells.
