= Hank Haney =

American professional golf instructor (born 1955)

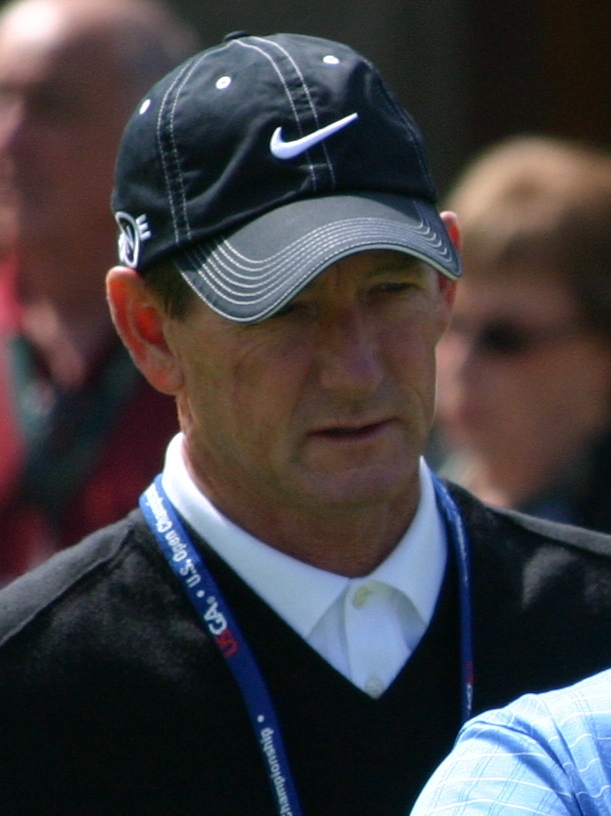
- Haney in 2008
- Born: August 24, 1955 (age 71); Lake Forest, Illinois
- Occupation: Professional golf instructor;

Hank Haney (born August 24, 1955) is an American professional golf instructor best known for coaching Tiger Woods and two-time major championship winner Mark O'Meara. Haney is a graduate of the University of Tulsa.

== Biography ==
Haney says, "My philosophy as a teacher is to teach my students to become their own best teacher by getting them to understand the flight of the golf ball and how it relates to the swing, with emphasis on swinging the golf club on their own correct swing plane".

In 2008, Haney started working with former NBA star and current NBA analyst Charles Barkley on the Golf Channel's The Haney Project: Charles Barkley, an attempt to fix Barkley's bad swing. Haney's show continued in 2010, this time with comedian Ray Romano. The third season, in 2011, featured talk radio host Rush Limbaugh. Series 4 (2012) featured a four-player shootout in Mario Batali, Adam Levine of Maroon 5, Sugar Ray Leonard, and Angie Everhart. Season 5 featured all-time winner of the most Olympic medals, Michael Phelps.

On Monday, May 10, 2010, one day after Woods withdrew in the final round of The Players Championship, and after an almost 6-year relationship, Haney informed Woods that he would no longer be his coach. Haney published "The Big Miss", a book detailing his time with Woods, two years later.

Haney has a video game of his own, Hank Haney's World Golf, that was released for Windows on November 16, 2010. A Mac OS X version was released under the name World Challenge Golf 2011 by Virtual Programming on September 28, 2011.

=== Suspension ===
On May 30, 2019, Haney was suspended from his PGA Tour show on SiriusXM Radio following disparaging comments he made on air about the Ladies Professional Golf Association (LPGA) that were viewed as racist and sexist. On his Sirius XM PGA Tour Radio show May 29, 2019, with the 74th United States Women's Open Championship beginning the next day at the Country Club of Charleston, Haney suggested he had no idea the tournament was about to start and asked where it would be held. Haney further claimed that he could not name even six players on the LPGA tour, and that if pressed to predict who would win, he said it would be a Korean named Lee, since there were so many (the tournament would be won by Lee Jeong-eun). Later in the interview Haney disparaged the second edition of the U.S. Senior Women's Open sponsored by the USGA two weeks earlier at Pine Needles Lodge and Golf Club in Southern Pines, N.C., asking co-host Steve Johnson "How many people you think attended the U.S. Senior Women’s Open, seriously? Seriously?", to which Johnson replied " I couldn’t even tell you who played in it. I couldn’t even tell you who played in it or who won." Before the end of the show, Haney was alerted that his remarks were being taken as sexist and racist, and while claiming not to be racist, nevertheless apologized. He also apologized later via Twitter. The following day Haney's show was dropped from SiriusXM's schedule and it was later announced that he had been suspended from the SiriusXM PGA TOUR Radio channel at the PGA Tour's instruction. SiriusXM announced that it was also reviewing Haney's status with the station. This led to a mini war of words between Woods and Haney after the former voiced support for this decision during The Memorial on May 31, saying that his former coach "obviously said what he meant, and he got what he deserved". Haney responded on June 4 tweeting his amazement that Woods "has become the moral authority on issues pertaining to women" and that, additionally to being a multi-time major champion, he must now also believe himself to be a mind reader because never in the 6 years of coaching him did Woods hear him "utter one racist or sexist word".

== Awards ==
- D Magazine (Dallas) "The Best of Dallas" - "Best Golf Instructor" - 2003
- Federazione Italiana Golf "Top Teacher" - 1989, 1990
- Golf Digest Number 4 Teacher, 2000, 2002
- Golf Digest Number 5 Teacher - 2003, 2004
- Golf Digest Number 6 Teacher - 2001
- Golf Digest Top 10 Teacher, 1993 - 1999
- Golf Digest Top 25 Teacher, 1984 - 1992
- Golf Magazine Top 100 Teacher, 1984 - 2004
- Golf World's Top 50 Golf Personalities Worldwide - 2000
- Gulf Coast PGA Chapter "Teacher of the Year" - 1984
- NCAA Division I District 6 Golf Coach of the Year - 1998
- North Texas PGA Metro Chapter "Horton Smith Award" - 1991, 1992
- North Texas PGA Section "Horton Smith Award" - 1990
- North Texas PGA Section "Teacher of the Year" - 1989, 1990, 1991, 1992, 1993
- PGA "Harvey Penick Award for Teaching Excellence" - 1984
- PGA Teacher of the Year (USA) - 1993
- Texas Golf Hall of Fame - 2014
- World Golf Teachers Hall of Fame - 2019
