= Chip Thomson =

American businessman

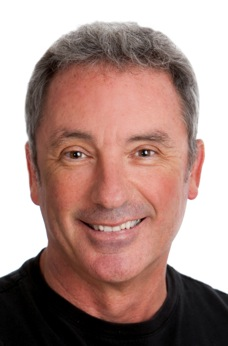
- Born: Chip Edward Thomson; March 26, 1957 (age 67); New Orleans, Louisiana, U.S.
- Occupation(s): Businessman; Golf instructor Actor; Writer

Chip Thomson is an American businessman, inventor, golf instructor, actor, and writer. He has coached PGA Tour golfers at the U.S. Open, PGA Championship, and Tour Championship.

As an inventor, Thomson is known for inventing 3rdiView, LiverSaver, Money Clamp, Windzone Motorcycle Toolkits, ZCLIP, and The Honey Do. He is also the author of Protege of Vagabonds.

== Early life ==
Thomson was born in New Orleans, Louisiana and grew up in Jacksonville, Illinois. He played golf at the collegiate level in Illinois before transitioning into founding his business.

== Career ==
During his career, Thomson has coached PGA Tour golfers at the U.S. Open, PGA Championship, and Tour Championship. He has also managed a restaurant, and sold nuclear equipment in Denver.

In 1991, Thomson moved to Austin, Texas and along with running his businesses, focused on coaching golf to PGA Tour players.

In 1997, Thomson founded Blue Chip Promotions. He is also the founder and president of Austin-based beza LP.

In 2002, Thomson participated in the Drambuie World Ice Golf Championship. In addition, Thomson has recruited, played in, and helped organize the Mexican Open. Later, in the same year, he conceptualized 3rdiView. The device, intended for training athletes and performers, was inspired during his coaching of golfer Pete Jordan for the 2002 U.S. Open.

In 2004, Thomson became the inaugural on-course commentator for the PGA Tour Network on XM Radio.

In 2011, Thomson invented the ZCLIP, a combination of a money clip and wallet made from carbon fiber.

In 2014, Thomson developed LiverSaver, a product designed to mitigate the impact of alcohol on the liver and other organs. He is also the inventor of multiple devices including Money Clamp, a hybrid between a money clip and a binder, and a system for predicting sporting event outcomes.

Thomson has contributed to golf and sports journalism, writing for newspapers and magazines, and has been an analyst for CBS and CNN.

Thomson transitioned into acting, drawing on his experience in front of the camera from his television shows, commercials, and short films. He is scheduled to appear in Shooter's Nail, a feature film directed by Lisa Regina and starring Eric Roberts, which focuses on the theme of bullying people with disabilities. He appeared in two segments of, From Dusk till Dawn.

== Bibliography ==
- Thomson, Chip; Pouch, John (2003). ""Flowers and Towels"". Theatre of the Mind. Noble House.
- Thomson, Chip (2014). Protege of Vagabonds. FriesenPress. ISBN 9781460238943. Archived from the original on March 10, 2014.
