= Bandsaw =

Power saw with a continuous band blade

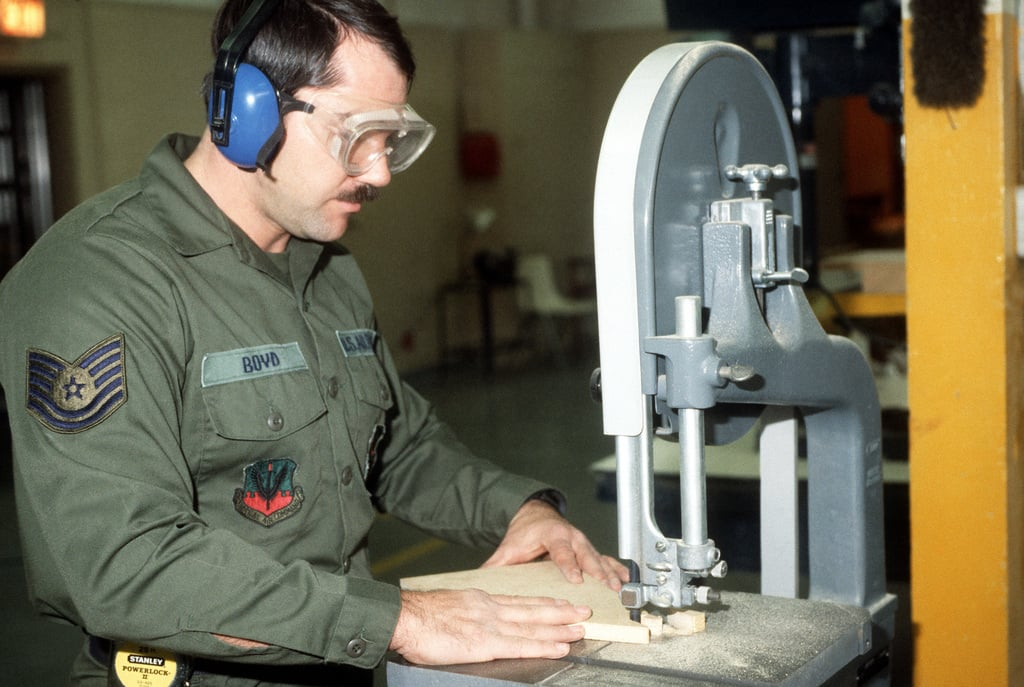
Bandsaw

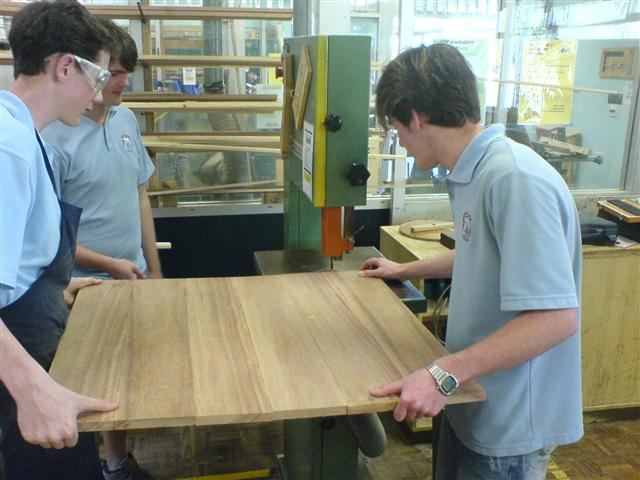
Students maneuver a large laminated board through a bandsaw together

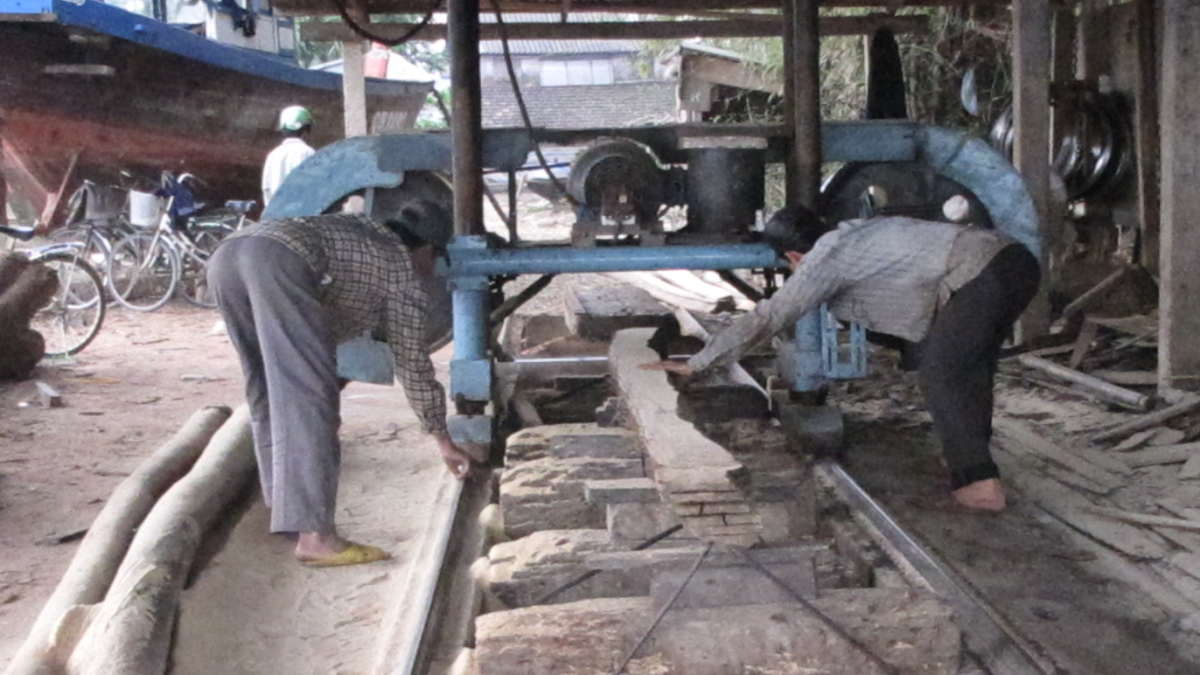
Horizontal bandsaw resawing planks at a boatyard in Hoi An, Vietnam

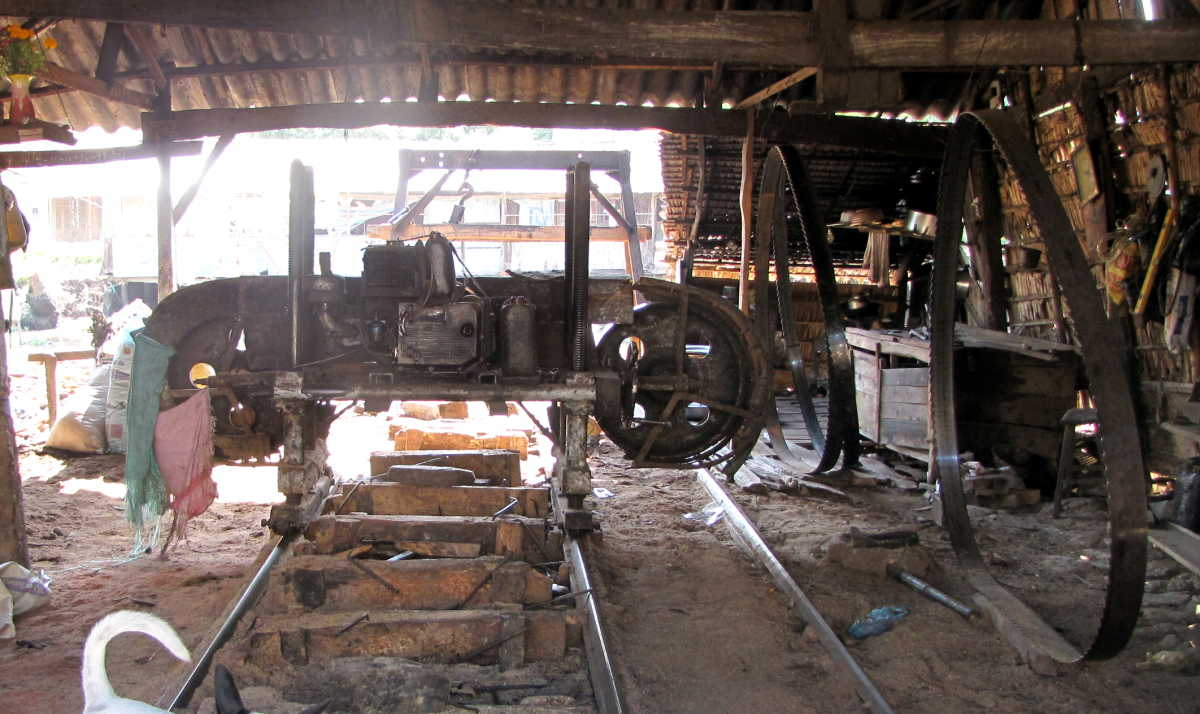
Larger resaw at a Mekong delta boatyard, fitted with a 150 mm (6") blade

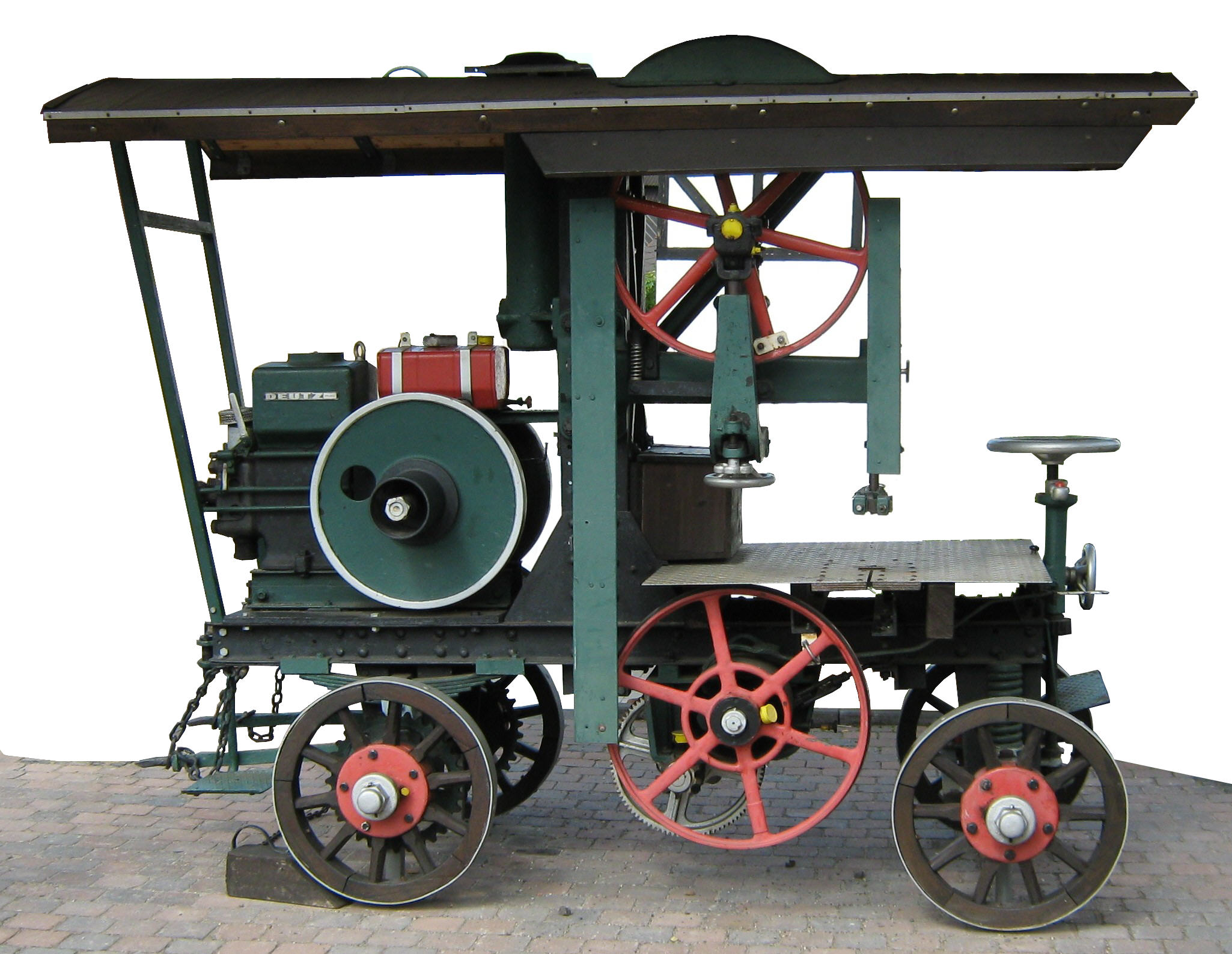
Bandsaw manufactured in 1911

A bandsaw (also written band saw) is a power saw with a long, sharp blade with two ends welded together to form an oval band. The banded blade of toothed metal is stretched between two or more wheels to cut material. They are used principally in woodworking, metalworking, and lumber milling, but may cut a variety of materials. Advantages include uniform cutting action as a result of an evenly distributed tooth load, and the ability to cut irregular or curved shapes like a jigsaw. The minimum radius of a curve is determined by the width of the band and its kerf. Most bandsaws have two wheels rotating in the same plane, one of which is powered, although some may have three or four to distribute the load. The blade itself can come in a variety of sizes and tooth pitches (teeth per inch, or TPI), which enables the machine to be highly versatile and able to cut a wide variety of materials including wood, metal and plastic. A band saw is recommended for use in cutting metal as it produces much less toxic fumes and particulates when compared with an angle grinder or reciprocating saw.

Almost all bandsaws today are powered by an electric motor.

== History ==
The idea of the bandsaw dates back to at least 1809, when William Newberry received a British patent for the idea, but bandsaws remained impractical largely because of the inability to produce accurate and durable blades using the technology of the day. Constant flexing of the blade over the wheels caused either the material or the joint welding it into a loop to fail.

Nearly 40 years passed before Frenchwoman Anne Paulin Crepin devised a welding technique overcoming this hurdle. She applied for a patent in 1846, and soon afterward sold the right to employ it to manufacturer A. Perin & Company of Paris. Combining this method with new steel alloys and advanced tempering techniques allowed Perin to create the first modern bandsaw blade.

The first American bandsaw patent was granted to Benjamin Barker of Ellsworth, Maine, in January 1836. The first factory produced and commercially available bandsaw in the U.S. was by a design of Paul Prybil.

Power hacksaws (with reciprocating blades) were once common in the metalworking industries, but bandsaws and cold saws have mostly displaced them.

== Types ==
=== Residential and light industry ===
Many workshops in residential garages or basements and in light industry contain small or medium-sized bandsaws that can cut wood, metal, or plastic. Often a general-purpose blade is left in place, although blades optimized for wood or metal can be switched out when volume of use warrants. Most residential and commercial bandsaws are of the vertical type mounted on a bench or a cabinet stand. Portable power tool versions, including cordless models, are also common in recent decades, allowing building contractors to bring them along on the truck to the jobsite.

=== Meat cutting ===
Saws for cutting meat are typically of all stainless steel construction with easy to clean features. The blades either have fine teeth with heat treated tips, or have plain or scalloped knife edges.

=== Metal fabrication shop and machine shop models ===
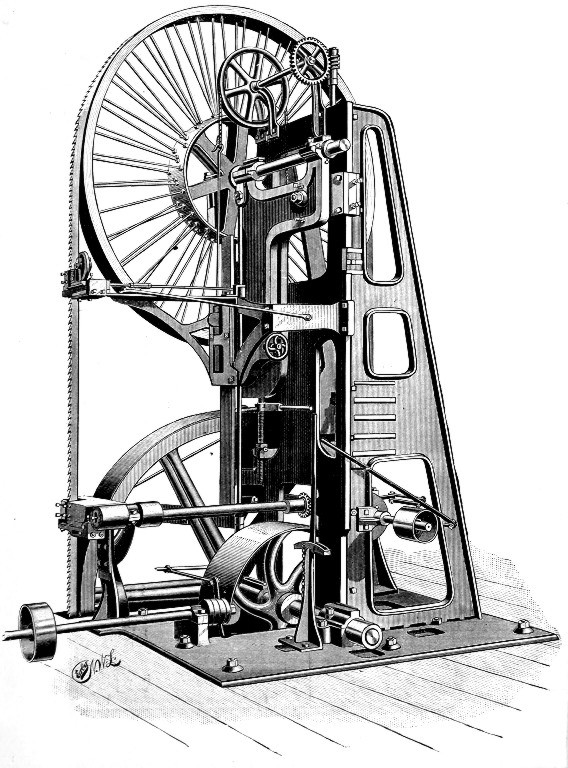
19th century wood bandsaw

Bandsaws dedicated to industrial metal-cutting use, such as for structural steel in fabrication shops and for bar stock in machine shops, are available in vertical and horizontal designs. Typical band speeds range from 40 ft/min (0.20 m/s) to 5,000 ft/min (25 m/s), although specialized bandsaws are built for friction cutting of hard metals and run band speeds of 15,000 ft/min (76 m/s). Metal-cutting bandsaws are usually equipped with brushes or brushwheels to prevent chips from becoming stuck in between the blade's teeth. Systems which cool the blade with cutting fluid are also common equipment on metal-cutting bandsaws. The coolant washes away swarf and keeps the blade cool and lubricated.

Horizontal bandsaws hold the workpiece stationary while the blade swings down through the cut. This configuration is used to cut long materials such as pipe or bar stock to length. Thus it is an important part of the facilities in most machine shops. The horizontal design is not useful for cutting curves or complicated shapes. Small horizontal bandsaws typically employ a gravity feed alone, retarded to an adjustable degree by a coil spring; on industrial models, the rate of descent is usually controlled by a hydraulic cylinder that bleeds through an adjustable valve. When the saw is set up for a cut, the operator raises the saw, positions the material to be cut underneath the blade, and then turns on the saw. The blade slowly descends into the material, cutting it as the band blade moves. When the cut is complete, a switch is tripped and the saw automatically turns off. More sophisticated versions of this type of saw are partially or entirely automated (via PLC or CNC) for high-volume cutting of machining blanks. Such machines provide a stream of cutting fluid recirculated from a sump, in the same manner that a CNC machining center does.

A vertical bandsaw, also called a contour saw, keeps the blade's path stationary while the workpiece is moved across it. This type of saw can be used to cut out complex shapes and angles. The part may be fed into the blade manually or with a power assist mechanism. This type of metal-cutting bandsaw is often equipped with a built-in blade welder. This not only allows the operator to repair broken blades or fabricate new blades quickly, but also allows for the blade to be purposely cut, routed through the center of a part, and re-welded in order to make interior cuts. These saws are often fitted with a built-in air blower to cool the blade and to blow chips away from the cut area giving the operator a clear view of the work. This type of saw is also built in a woodworking version. The woodworking type is generally of much lighter construction and does not incorporate a power feed mechanism, coolant, or welder.

Advancements have also been made in the bandsaw blades used to cut metals. Bimetal blades with high speed steel teeth, including cobalt grades, are now the norm. The development of new tooth geometries and tooth pitches has produced increased production rates and greater blade life. New materials and processes such as M51 steel and the cryogenic treatment of blades have produced results that were thought impossible just a few years ago. New machines have been developed to automate the welding process of bandsaw blades as well.

=== Timber cutting ===
Timber mills use very large bandsaws for ripping lumber; they are preferred over circular saws for ripping because they can accommodate large-diameter timber and because of their smaller kerf (cut size), resulting in less waste.

There are also small portable sawmills consisting of a somewhat smaller bandsaw mounted on a guiding table, which are called bandsaw mills (band saw mills, band sawmills). Like chain saw mills (a chainsaw on a guiding table), they can be used inexpensively by one or two people out in the field. These tools may be used by off-gridders and those doing small scale lumber processing in remote areas. Today, even these mills may be powered by electricity.

In a full-size sawmill, the blades are mounted on wheels with a diameter large enough not to cause metal fatigue due to flexing when the blade repeatedly changes from a circular to a straight profile. It is stretched very tight (with fatigue strength of the saw metal being the limiting factor). Bandsaws of this size need to have a deformation worked into them that counteracts the forces and heating of operation. This is called "benching". They also need to be removed and serviced at regular intervals. Sawfilers or sawdoctors are the craftsmen responsible for this work.

The shape of the tooth gullet is highly optimized and designed by the sawyer and sawfiler. It varies according to the mill, as well as the type and condition of the wood. Frozen logs often require a "frost notch" ground into the gullet to break the chips. The shape of the tooth gullet is created when the blade is manufactured and its shape is automatically maintained with each sharpening. The sawfiler will need to maintain the grinding wheel's profile with periodic dressing of the wheel.

Proper tracking of the blade is crucial to accurate cutting and considerably reduces blade breakage. The first step to ensuring good tracking is to check that the two bandwheels or flywheels are co-planar. This can be done by placing a straightedge across the front of the wheels and adjusting until each wheel touches on both its top and bottom. Rotate the wheels with the blade in position and properly tensioned and check that the tracking is correct. Now install the blade guide rollers and leave a gap of about 1mm between the back of the blade and the guide flange. The teeth of blades that have become narrow through repeated sharpening will foul the front edge of the guide rollers due to their kerf set and force the blade out of alignment. This can be remedied by cutting of a small step on the rollers' front edges to accommodate the protruding teeth. Ideally the rollers should be crowned, (see belt and pulley systems) a configuration that assists in the proper tracking of bands and belts, at the same time allowing clearance for the set of the teeth.

==== Head saws ====
Head saws are large bandsaws that make the initial cuts in a log. They generally have a 2 to 3 in (51 to 76 mm) tooth space on the cutting edge and sliver teeth on the back. Sliver teeth are non-cutting teeth designed to wipe slivers out of the way when the blade needs to back out of a cut.

==== Resaws ====
A resaw is a large bandsaw optimized for cutting timber along the grain to reduce larger sections into smaller sections or veneers. Resawing veneers requires a wide blade—commonly 2 to 3 in (51 to 76 mm)—with a small kerf to minimize waste. Resaw blades of up to 1 in (25 mm) may be fitted to a standard bandsaw.

==== Double cut saws ====
Double cut saws have cutting teeth on both sides. They are generally very large, similar in size to a head saw.

== Construction ==
=== Feed mechanisms ===
- Gravity feed saws fall under their own weight. Most such saws have a method to allow the cutting force to be adjusted, such as a movable counterbalancing weight, a coil spring with a screw-thread adjustment, or a hydraulic or pneumatic damper (speed control valve). The latter does not force the blade downwards, but rather simply limits the speed at which the saw can fall, preventing excessive feed on thin or soft parts. This is analogous to door closer hardware whose damping action keeps the door from slamming. Gravity feed designs are common in small saws.
- Hydraulic feed saws use a positive pressure hydraulic piston to advance the saw through the work at variable pressure and rate. Common in production saws.
- Screw feed saws employ a leadscrew to move the saw.

=== Fall mechanisms ===
- Pivot saws hinge in an arc as they advance through the work.
- Single column saws have a large diameter column that the entire saw rides up and down on, very similar to a drill press.
- Dual column saws have a pair of large columns, one on either side of the work, for very high rigidity and precision. The dual column setup is unable to make use of a miter base due to inherent design. Dual column saws are the largest variety of machine bandsaws encountered, to the point where some make use of a rotary table and X axis to perform complex cutting.

=== Automated saws ===
Automatic bandsaws feature preset feed rate, return, fall, part feeding, and part clamping. These are used in production environments where having a machine operator per saw is not practical. One operator can feed and unload many automatic saws.

Some automatic saws rely on numerical control to not only cut faster, but to be more precise and perform more complex miter cuts.

=== Common tooth forms ===
- Precision blade gives accurate cuts with a smooth finish.
- Buttress blade provides faster cutting and large chip loads.
- Claw tooth blade gives additional clearance for fast cuts and soft material.

At least two teeth must be in contact with the workpiece at all times to avoid stripping off the teeth.

== See also ==
- Chainsaw
- Bandsaw box
- Portable sawmill
- Band knife
- Wire saw
