= Wallet =

Flat case or pouch used to carry small personal items

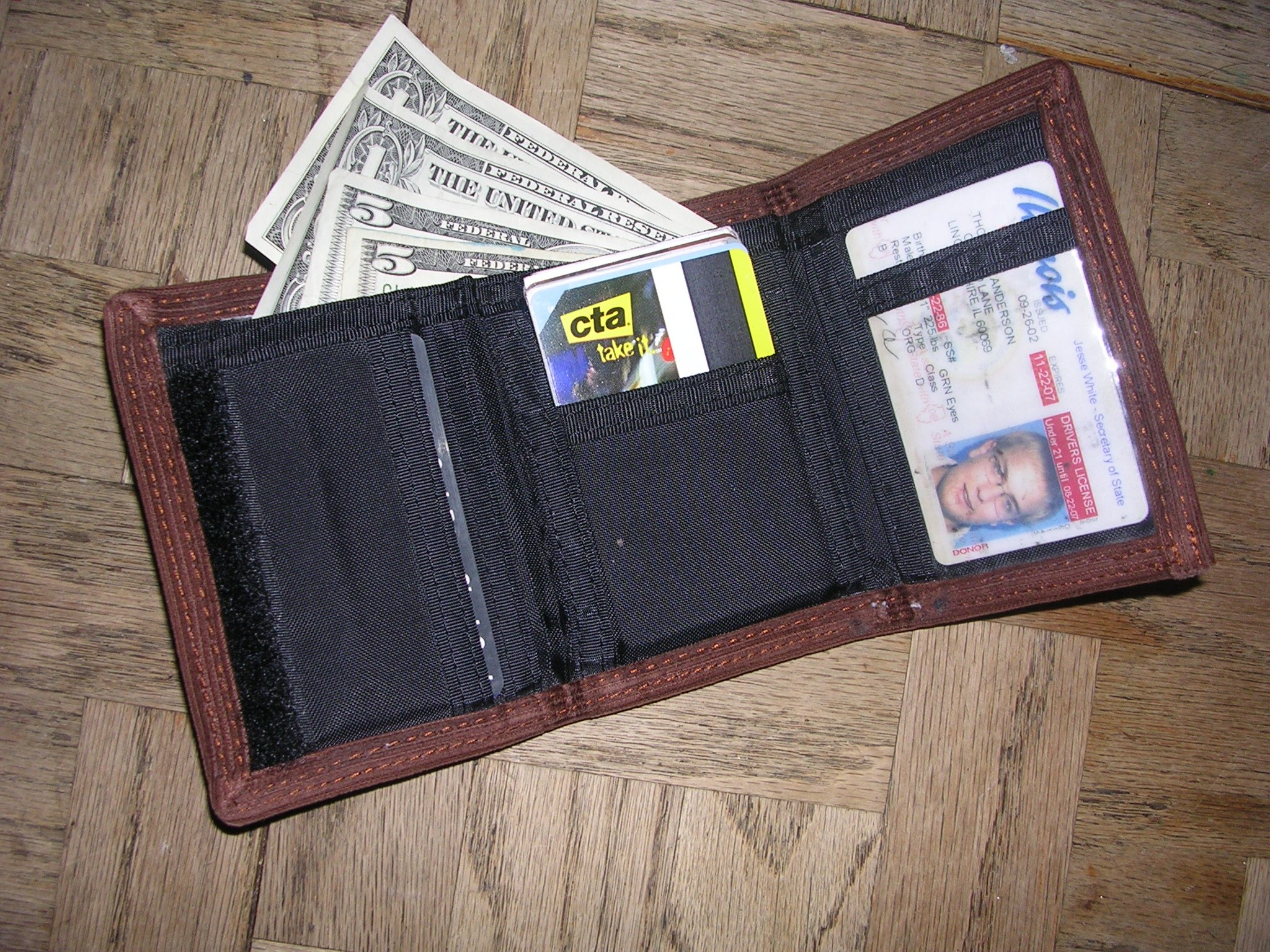
A trifold wallet with pockets for notes and cards, and a window to display an identification card

A wallet is a flat case or pouch, often used to carry small personal items such as physical currency, debit cards, and credit cards; identification documents such as driving licence, identification card, club card; photographs, transit pass, business cards and other paper or laminated cards. Wallets are generally made of fabric or leather, and they are usually pocket-sized and foldable.

Wallets may include a money clip, coin purse, chain fastener, strap, snap, rein, or zipper. There are specialized wallets for holding passports, wearable ID cards, and checkbooks. Some unusual wallets are worn on the wrist or shoe. Wallets may be used as a fashion accessory, or to demonstrate the style, wealth, or social status of the owner.

== Etymology ==
The word originated in the late 14th century, meaning "bag" or "knapsack", from uncertain origin (Norman-French golette (little snout)?), or from similar Germanic word, from the Proto-Germanic term "wall", which means "roll" (from the root "wel", meaning "to turn or revolve." (see for example "knapzak" in Dutch and Frisian). The early usage by Shakespeare described something that we would recognise as more like a backpack today. The modern meaning of "flat case for carrying paper money" is first recorded in 1834 in American English.

The ancient Greek word kibisis, said to describe the pouch carried by the god Hermes and the sack in which the mythical hero Perseus carried the severed head of the monster Medusa, has been typically translated as "wallet".

== History ==
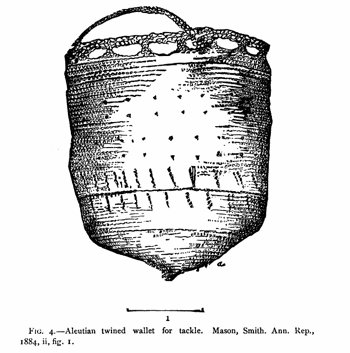
Aleutian Wallet for carrying tackle

=== Ancient Greece ===
The classicist A. Y. Campbell set out to answer the question, "What...in ancient literature, are the uses of a wallet?" He deduced, as a Theocritean scholar, that "the wallet was the poor man's portable larder; or, poverty apart, it was a thing that you stocked with provisions." He found that sometimes a man may be eating out of it directly but the most characteristic references allude to its being "replenished as a store", not in the manner of a lunch basket but more as a survival pack.

=== Renaissance ===
Wallets were developed after the introduction of paper currency to the West in the 1600s. (The first paper currency was introduced in the New World by the Massachusetts Bay Colony in 1690.) Prior to the introduction of paper currency, coin purses (usually simple drawstring leather pouches) were used for storing coins. Early wallets were made primarily of cow or horse leather and included a small pouch for printed calling cards.

In recounting the life of the Elizabethan merchant, John Frampton, Lawrence C. Wroth describes the merchant as, "a young English-man of twenty-five years, decently dressed, ..., wearing a sword, and carrying fixed to his belt something he called a 'bowgett' (or budget), that is, a leathern pouch or wallet in which he carried his cash, his book of accounts, and small articles of daily necessity".

=== 19th century ===
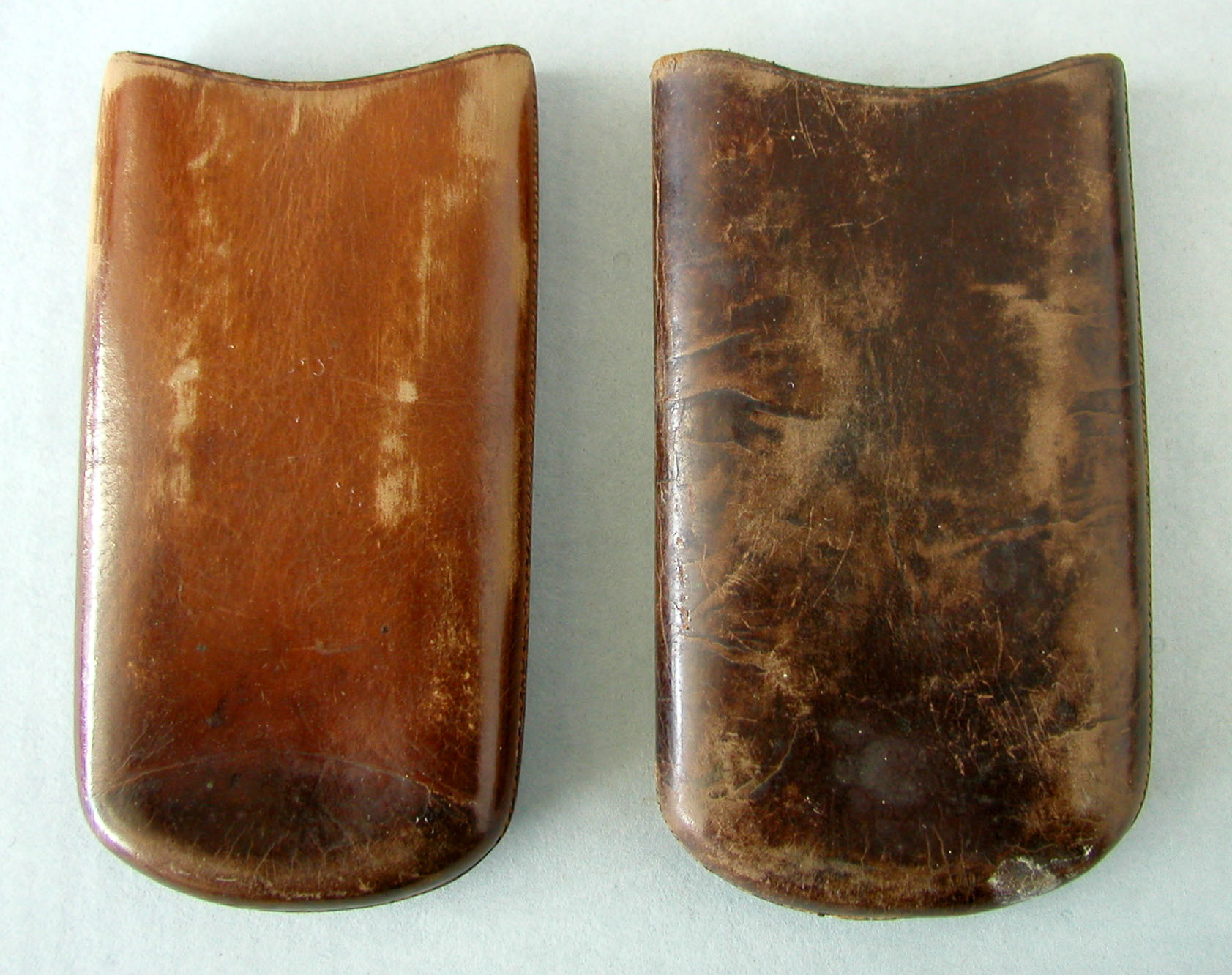
A mid-19th century wallet or pouch made of leather

In addition to money or currency, a wallet would also be used for carrying dried meat, victuals, "treasures", and "things not to be exposed". Wallets originally were used by early Industrial Americans. It was considered "semi-civilized" in 19th century America to carry one's wallet on one's belt. At this time, carrying goods or a wallet in one's pocket was considered uncivilized and uncommon.

In Spain, a wallet was a case for smoking paraphernalia: "Every man would carry a small sheaf of white paper in addition to a small leather wallet which would contain a flint and steel along with a small quantity of so-called yesca, being a dried vegetable fibre which a spark would instantly ignite."

=== 20th century–present ===
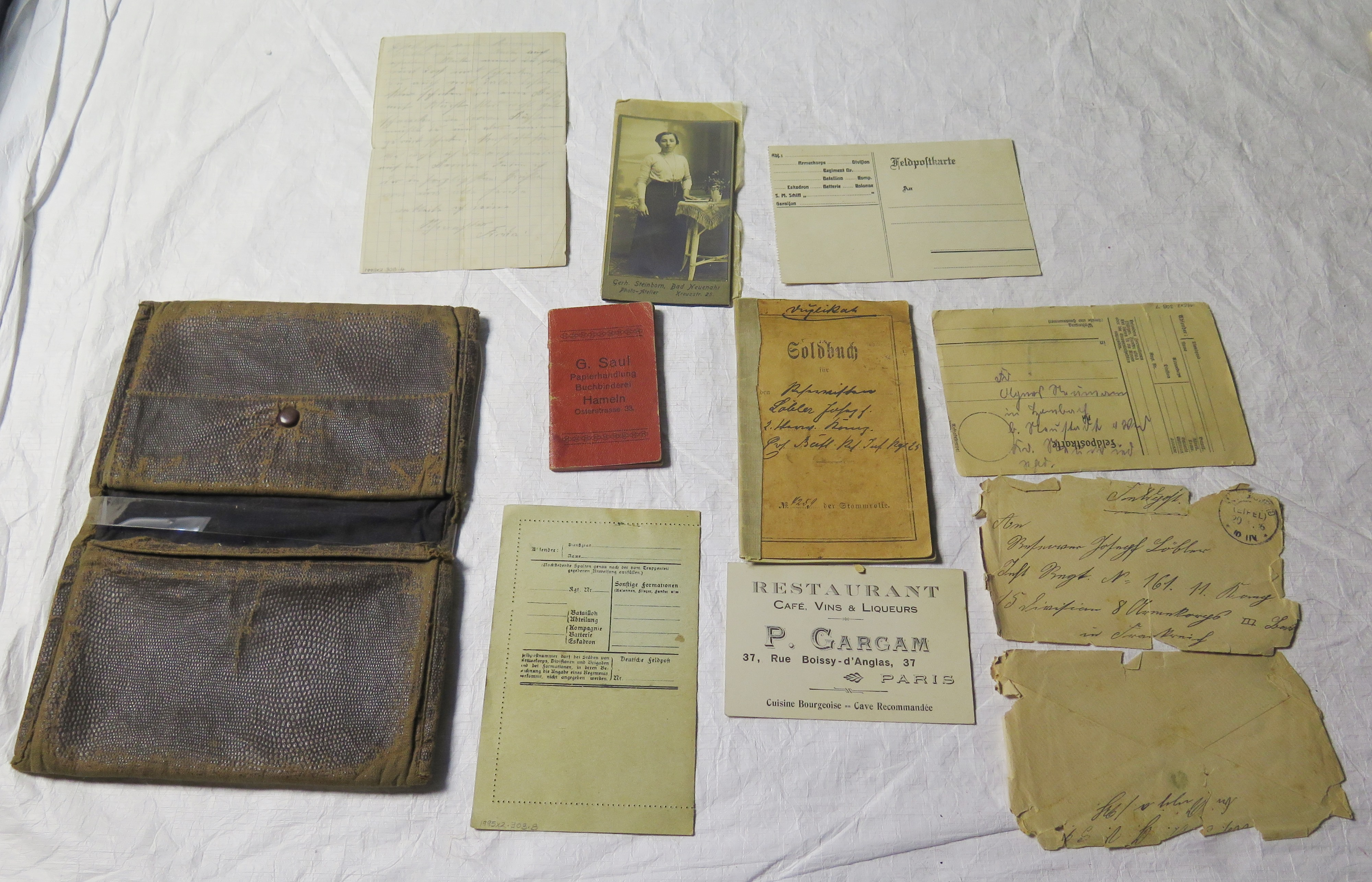
A WW I era wallet and its contents

The modern bi-fold wallet with multiple "card slots" became standardized in the early 1950s with the introduction of the first credit cards. Some innovations include the introduction of the velcro-closure wallet in the 1970s. Pocket-sized wallets remain popular to this day.

For cryptocurrencies that only exist in cyberspace as entries in some online ledger, a cryptocurrency wallet is a computing tool whose purpose is to securely keep the owner’s secret key, to authenticate the owner, and to let the owner sign transactions securely. A "hardware wallet" is a single purpose computer to do this even more safely.

== Contemporary examples ==
Wallets are usually designed to hold banknotes and credit cards and fit into a pocket or handbag. Small cases for securing banknotes which do not have space for credit cards or identification cards may be classified as money clips: this may also be used to describe small cases designed to hold ISO/IEC 7810 cards alone.

Breast wallet
Also called a "secretary wallet", this is a wallet in which banknotes are not folded. They are intended for men's breast pocket in a jacket, or for a handbag. Breast wallets will often hold cheques and other monetary documents as they are too large for storage in a pants pocket.
Bi-fold wallet
a type of wallet in which the banknotes are folded over once. Credit cards and identification cards may be stored horizontally or vertically.
Tri-fold wallet
a wallet with two folds, in which credit cards are generally stored vertically.
Front pocket wallet
a case with no currency compartment and very few pockets for cards. Usually banknotes are folded and held in a wallet compartment.
Money clip wallet
similar to a front pocket wallet in terms of size, with banknotes usually held in by a clip secured by a strong magnet.
Long wallet
a larger wallet typically worn with jeans, fastened by a chain, strap, or leather band. Bills are held flat, and long wallets typically have a coin purse. Popularized by bikers to secure their wallets while riding a motorcycle, smaller chained wallets became popular in 1970s−'80s punk fashion and in the early 1990s with the grunge fashion movement as well as heavy metal fashion. Long wallets are popular with men in cash-based countries like Japan and may reflect Native American aesthetic influence.
Wallet band
a type of wallet that uses a continuous elastic band, made of fabric or rubber, to secure cards and/or cash. Wallet bands reduce the bulk of a traditional wallet.
Wristlet
a type of wallet that can be secured to the wrist, to keep one's hands free.
Travel wallet
used by travelers to hold essential documentation together, such as passports, tickets, boarding passes, foreign currency, traveler's cheques, itinerary, travel insurance, hotel booking information, and other similar items.
ID case/neck pouch
thin nylon or leather cases with plastic see-through compartments designed to hold an ID card. Usually worn around the neck, many have extra pockets for holding small items, hence they also function as wallets.
Shoewallet
a small pouch attached to a shoe to be used as a wallet. Designed primarily to be worn during exercise.
Digital wallet
a computer file for maintaining digital currency.
Cryptocurrency wallet
a digital wallet where private keys are stored for cryptocurrencies like Bitcoin.
Hardware wallet
a cryptocurrency wallet built as a separate physical device which identifies the owner, and lets the owner sign online transactions in a secure manner.
Side by side wallet
divides the contents into two stacks instead of one, so it is half as thick. May be made of very thin fabric.
L-Zip wallet
a rectangular shaped wallet with a zipper that runs along 2 sides of the wallet.
Metal wallet
a slim wallet made from metal, usually aluminum or titanium. Can be found combined with other materials such as wood or leather.
Credit card holder
a rectangular shaped wallet for holding credit cards.
Cardholder zip wallet
a rectangular shaped wallet with a zipper for coins and credit cardholder.
Checkbook
a wallet that can hold standard-sized cheques
Envelope
a long wallet that has features similar to an envelope with a covering flap.
Automatic wallet
a wallet with a mechanism that ejects inserted cards with a button to display them for use. Also known as a pop-up or cascading wallet.
Tactical wallet
a functional wallet that incorporates a ruler, small saw, knife, bottle opener, or other tools. It is a thin, wallet-sized multitool, with similarities to a Swiss army knife.
RFID blocking wallet
a wallet acting as a faraday cage around proximity-sensing enabled cards. Can block NFC & RFID signals, preventing portable RFID readers from reading sensitive data.

== Materials ==
The traditional material for wallets is leather or fabric, but many other flexible flat sheet materials can be used in their fabrication. Non-woven textiles such as Tyvek are used, sometimes including reuse of waterproof maps printed on that material. Woven metals, such as fine mesh made of copper or stainless steel have been incorporated into wallets that are promoted as having electromagnetic shielding properties to protect against unauthorized scanning of embedded NFC and RFID tags. Do-it-yourself websites such as Instructables feature many projects for making wallets out of materials such as denim, Kevlar, or duct tape.

== Regional differences ==
Some wallets, particularly in Europe where larger value coins are prevalent, contain a coin purse compartment. Some wallets have built-in clasps or bands to keep them closed. As European banknotes, such as euros and pounds, are typically larger than American banknotes in size, they do not fit in some smaller American wallets.

== Metaphorical usage ==
The term wallet is also used as a synecdoche to refer to an individual's overall personal budget. One of the definitions of "syndecdoche", by Sasse, uses a wallet reference as an example of the meaning of the term ("an abbreviated speech in which the containing vessel is mentioned instead of its contents"), such as when a person holds up their wallet to a person asking for money, while saying "here is $100". A wallet is also used as an example in a definition for the related rhetorical device of metonymy: "If we cannot strike offenders in the heart, let us strike them in the wallet."

== Gallery ==
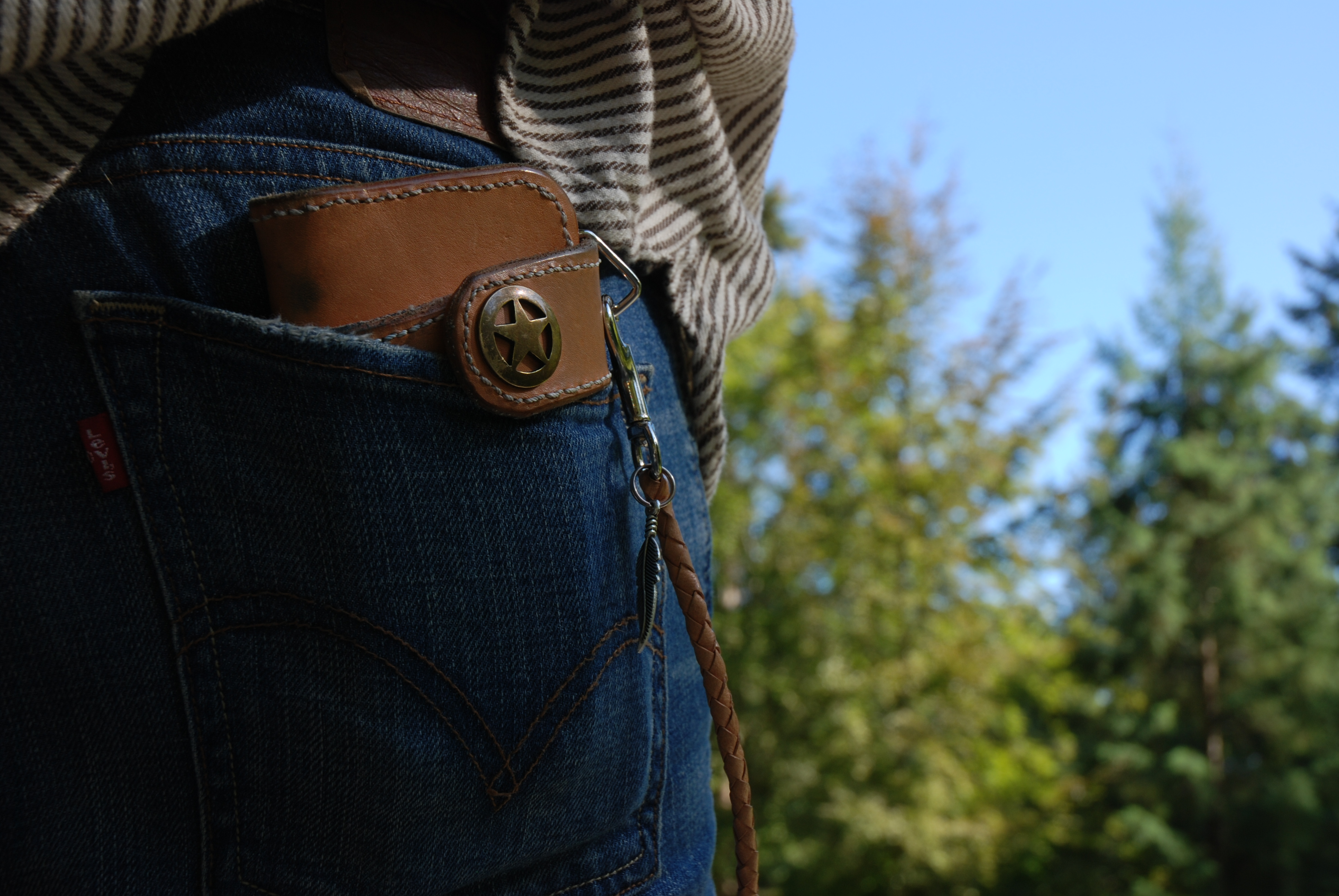
A large wallet attached with a leather cord or magnet

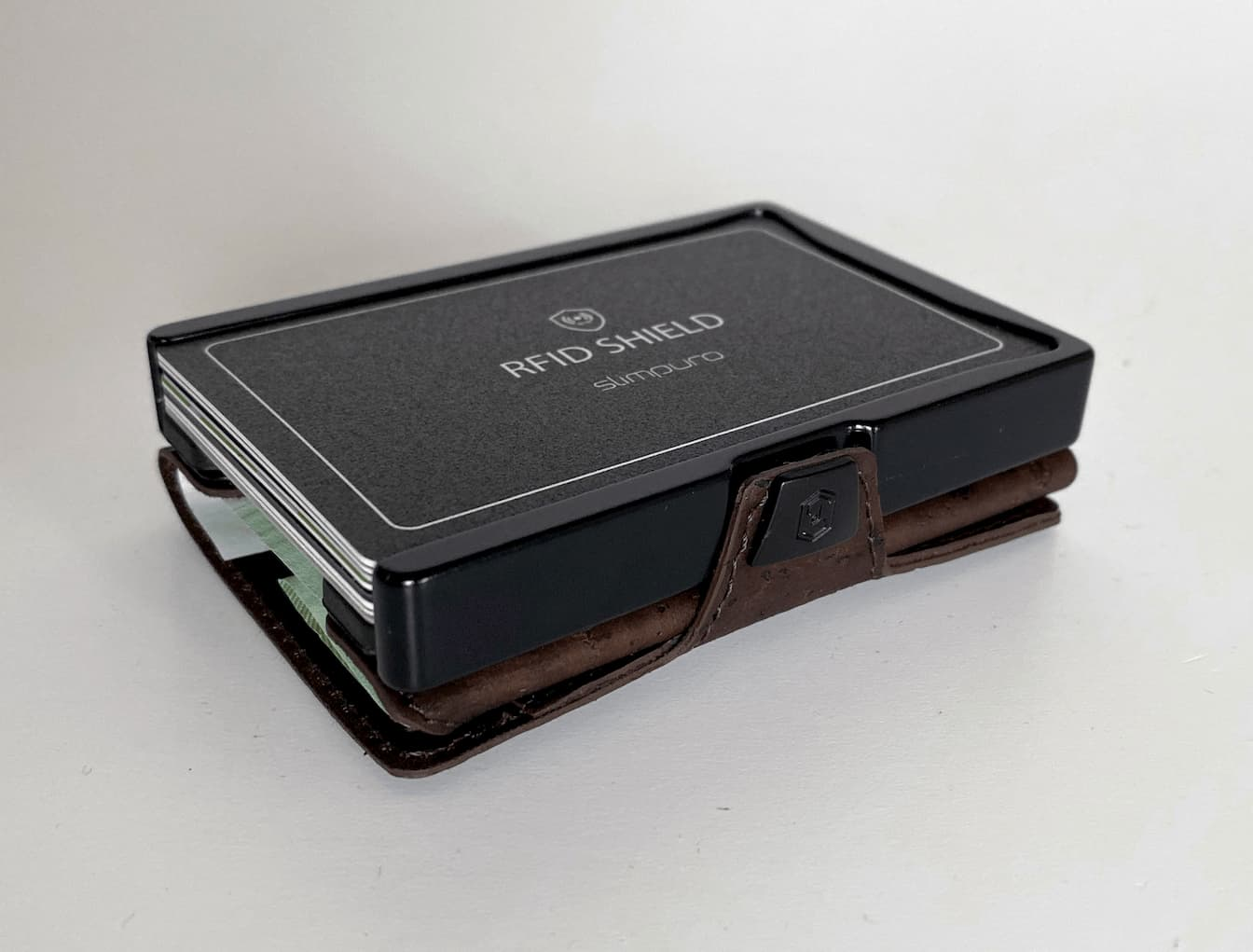
An RFID signal-blocking slim wallet

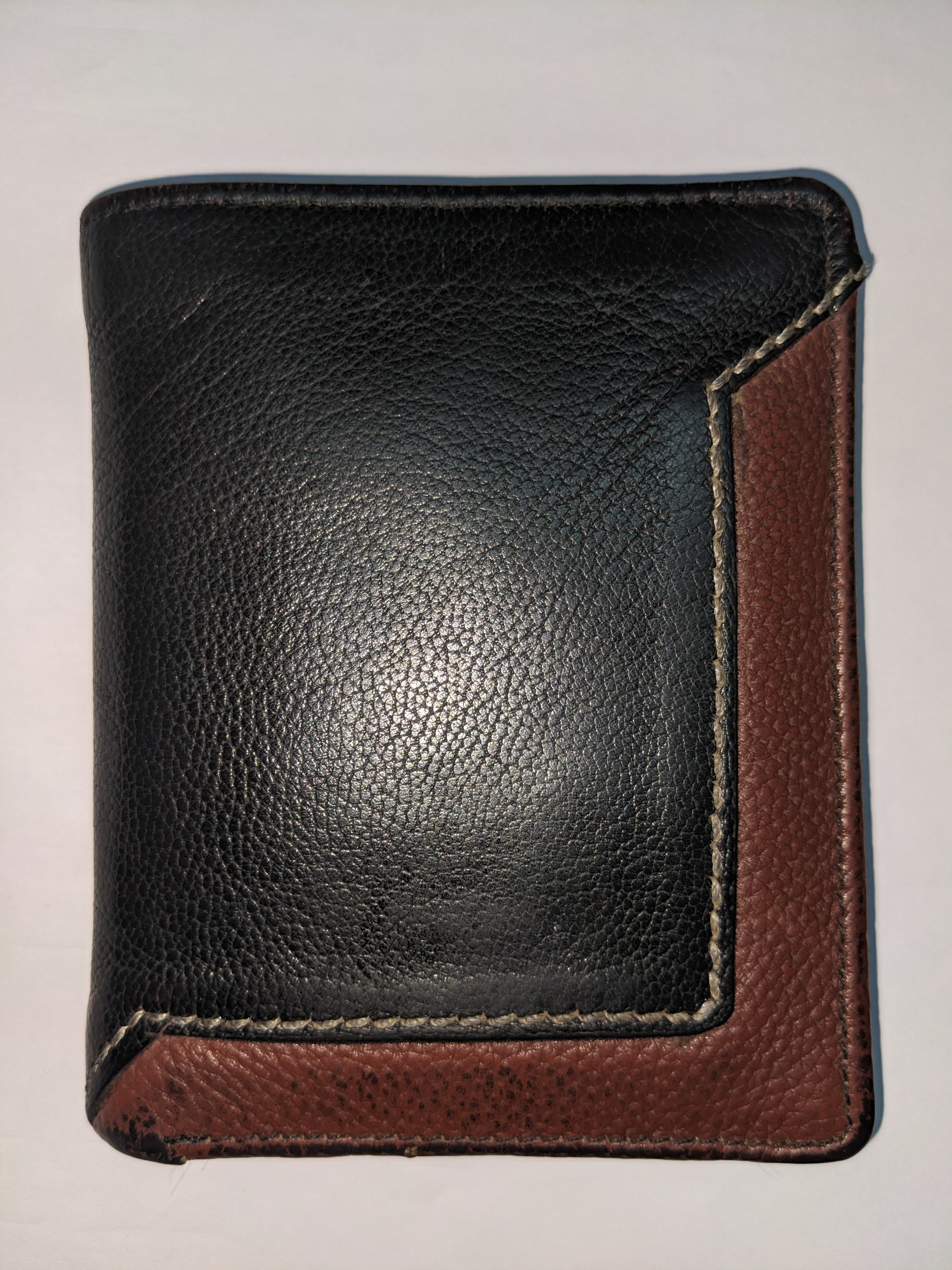
A leather wallet

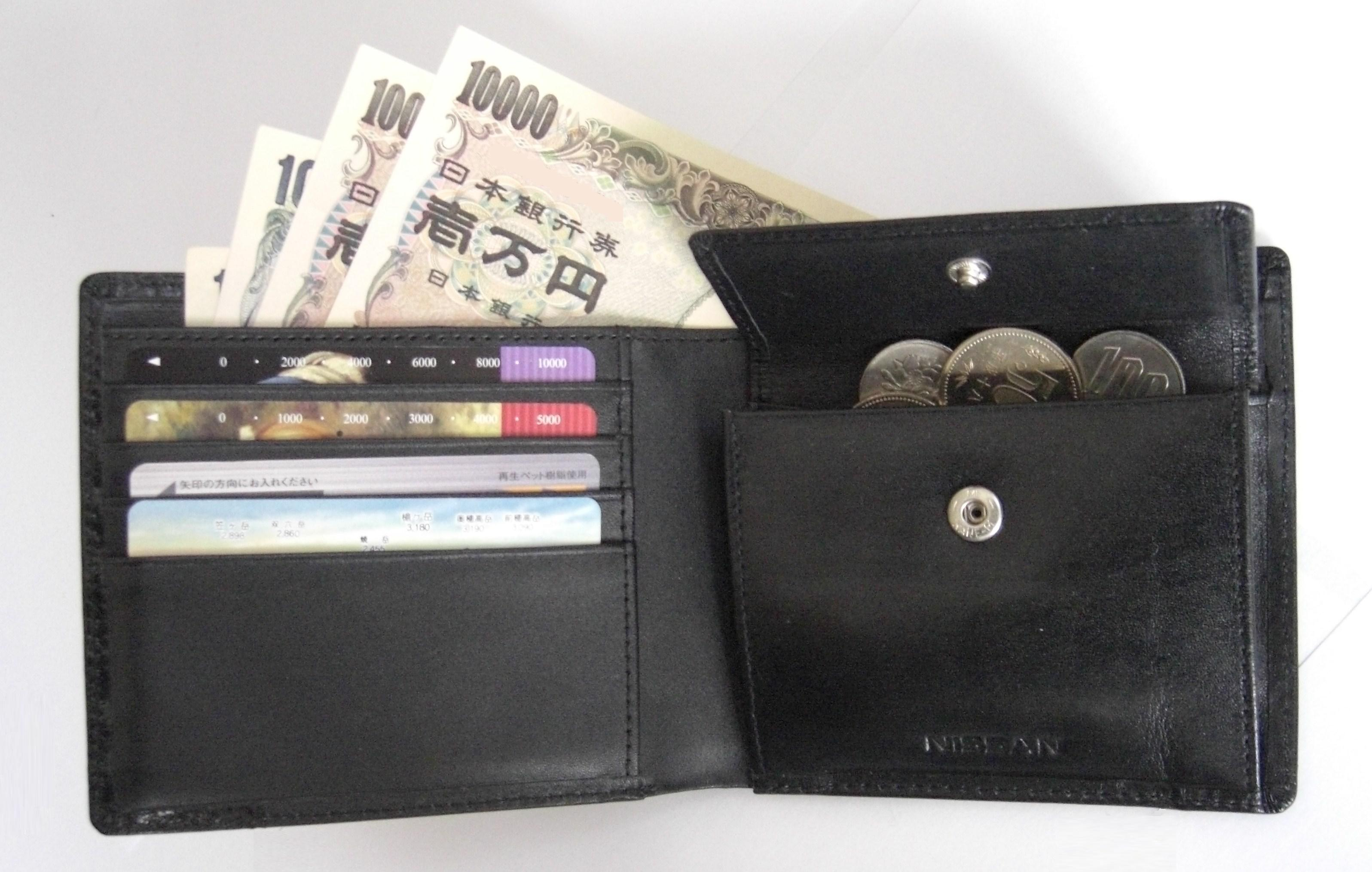
A Japanese wallet with a coin purse

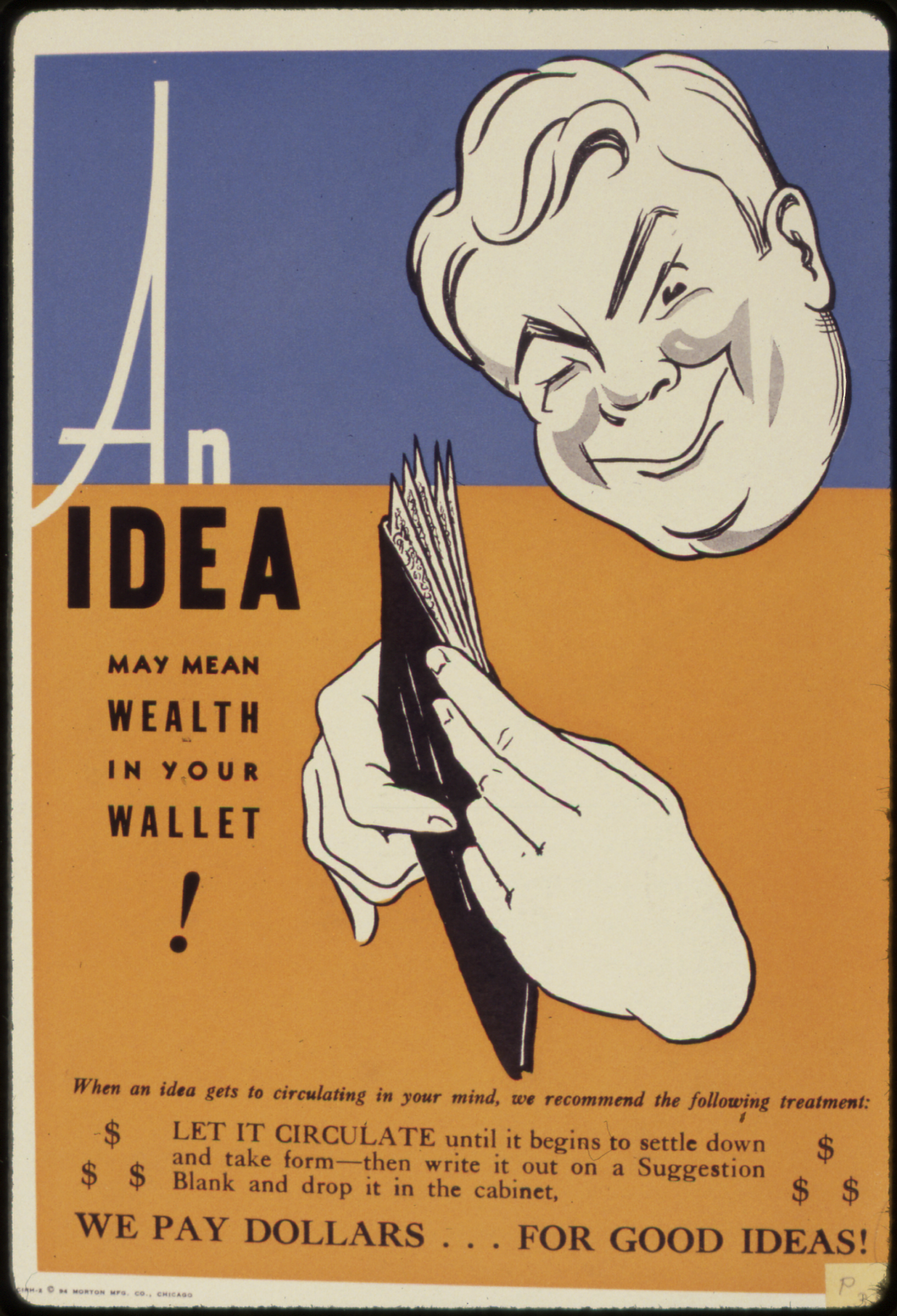
A poster seeking innovative suggestions tells readers "An Idea May Mean Wealth In Your Wallet".

== See also ==
- Digital wallet
- Coin purse
- Money bag
- Money belt
- Netsuke
- Sporran
