= Bandsaw box =

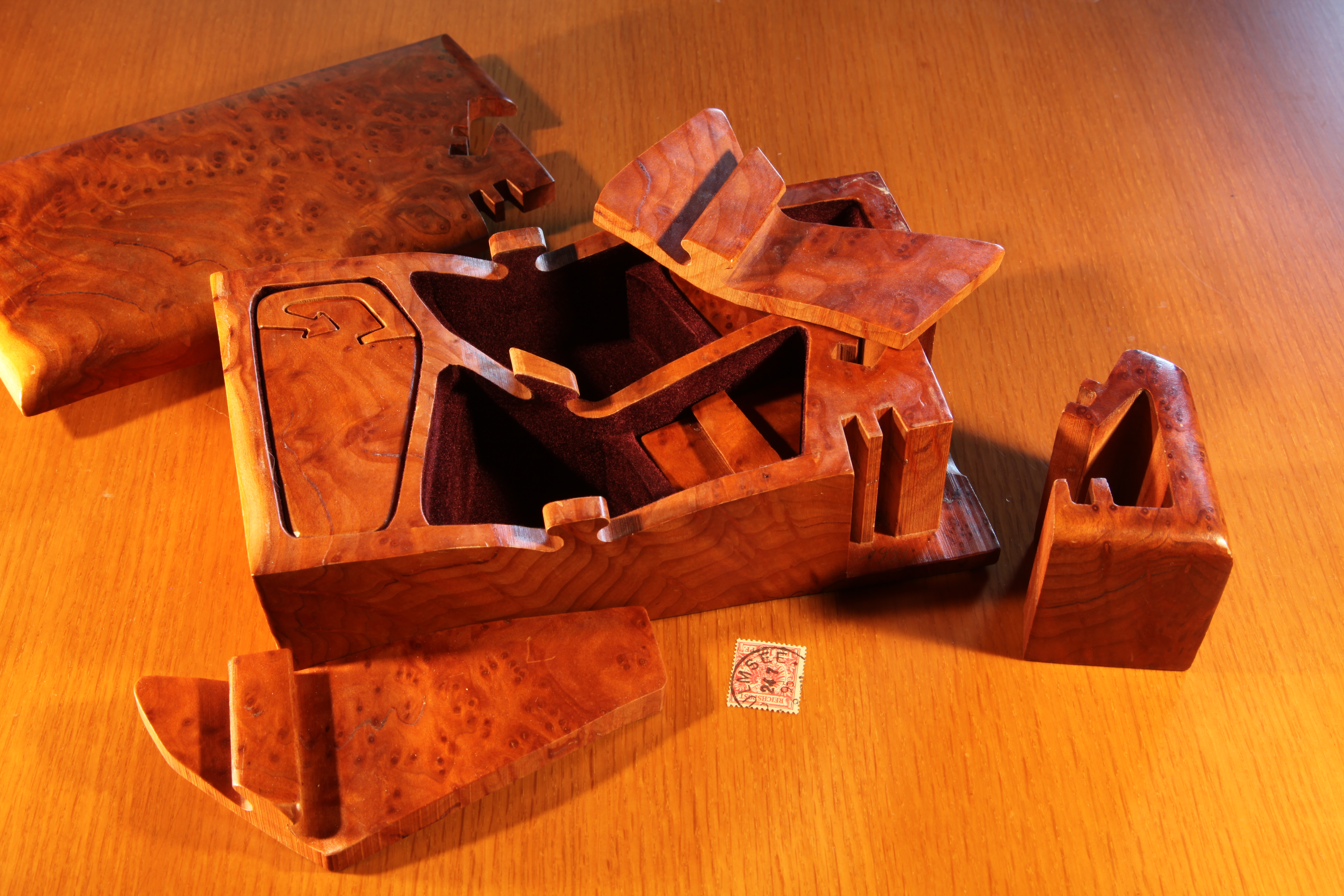
Using the techniques of a bandsawn box repeatedly, to make a puzzle box

Band saw boxes are boxes made out of wood using only a bandsaw or fretsaw for cutting them out. The ability of these saws to cut arbitrary shapes with tight corners allows boxes to be cut from solid blocks with relatively little effort and much flexibility for their shape and style. The popularity of these boxes, often a new bandsaw owner's early project, has led to a plethora of books on them, dating from the first in 1985.

== Design ==
The basic design is of two nested receptacles, making a hollow drawer and an enclosure to hold it, rather than a hollow box with lid. The same broad technique is used to make both parts: the reverse face of the box is sawn off and saved for later, then a large hole is sawn through the other piece. The retained piece is then glued back on, making an overall prismatic open-ended box.

The wood may be a solid block, a laminated block or a log from the woodpile. Whereas most boxes have straight sides and square corners, band saw boxes have virtually no restrictions as to shape. They can be oval, heart-shaped, lizard-shaped, or any shape the maker can think of. Other tools such as belt sanders and drum sanders can be used to shape and sand the box smooth.

== Construction ==
There are multiple techniques for constructing band saw boxes. The primary technique starts by cutting the main shape of the box. Then a 1/8" to 1/4" piece of wood is cut off what is to become the back. The drawer shape is cut within the main shape, which involves cutting through the main body, and the body must be glued back together. Once the drawer shape is cut, the usual technique is to remove 1/8" to 1/4" of material from both the front and rear of the drawer shape to be used as faces. The remaining stock is then reduced or hollowed out to produce a drawer or cavity. The front and rear drawer faces are glued back to the remaining hollowed drawer stock, and the back that was cut off is glued to the main body. A handle can be added to the front of the drawer.

A bandsaw blade is a continuous loop, whereas a fretsaw blade is a straight strip with two free ends. This means that a fretsaw can saw a loop inside the wooden block, starting from a drilled hole; it's easy to unfasten the blade from the saw frame or fretsaw machine, pass it through and then reinstall it. This is impractical for a bandsaw. A bandsaw though can only saw from the outside in, so the outer part of the box always has a split left in it. There are several techniques for hiding this split. Usually, especially for free-form or googie shapes, the outer part of the box is sawn with a short, clean saw cut from the outside to the main loop cut, always parallel to the grain direction. Afterwards this cut can be glued and the outer squeezed to close up the gap. Sometimes the side of the box is sawn off by a separate cut first, either with the bandsaw or a more precise table saw. The loop cut now becomes an open-sided C shape instead, which is easy to cut with the bandsaw. Again the two parts are glued together again afterwards, and because the cut is along the grain it becomes near-invisible.

== Bibliography ==
- Crabb, Tom (1985). Making Wood Boxes with a Bandsaw. Sterling Publishing Co. ISBN 9780806962467.
- Grabarczyk, Dave (2021). Take Your Band Saw Box to the Next Level. Woodencreations.Org. ISBN 9781737169635.
- Menke, Donna LaChance (2006). The Ultimate Band Saw Box Book. Sterling Publishing Co. ISBN 9781626542419.
- Picciuto, David (2020). The New Bandsaw Box Book. Cedar Lane Press. ISBN 978-1950934140.
- Power, Dale (1999). Making Wooden Boxes. Schiffer. ISBN 9780764308482.
- Traeger, John (2020). Woodworking Band Saw Box Patterns. Owner. ISBN 9781735296104.
- Ventura, Lois (2015). Building Beautiful Boxes with Your Band Saw. Echo Point Books & Media. ISBN 978-1626549463.
- Vollmer, Jeff (2010). Puzzle Boxes: Fun and Intriguing Bandsaw Projects. F&W Media. ISBN 9781558708471.
