= Money clip =

Device typically used to store cash and credit cards

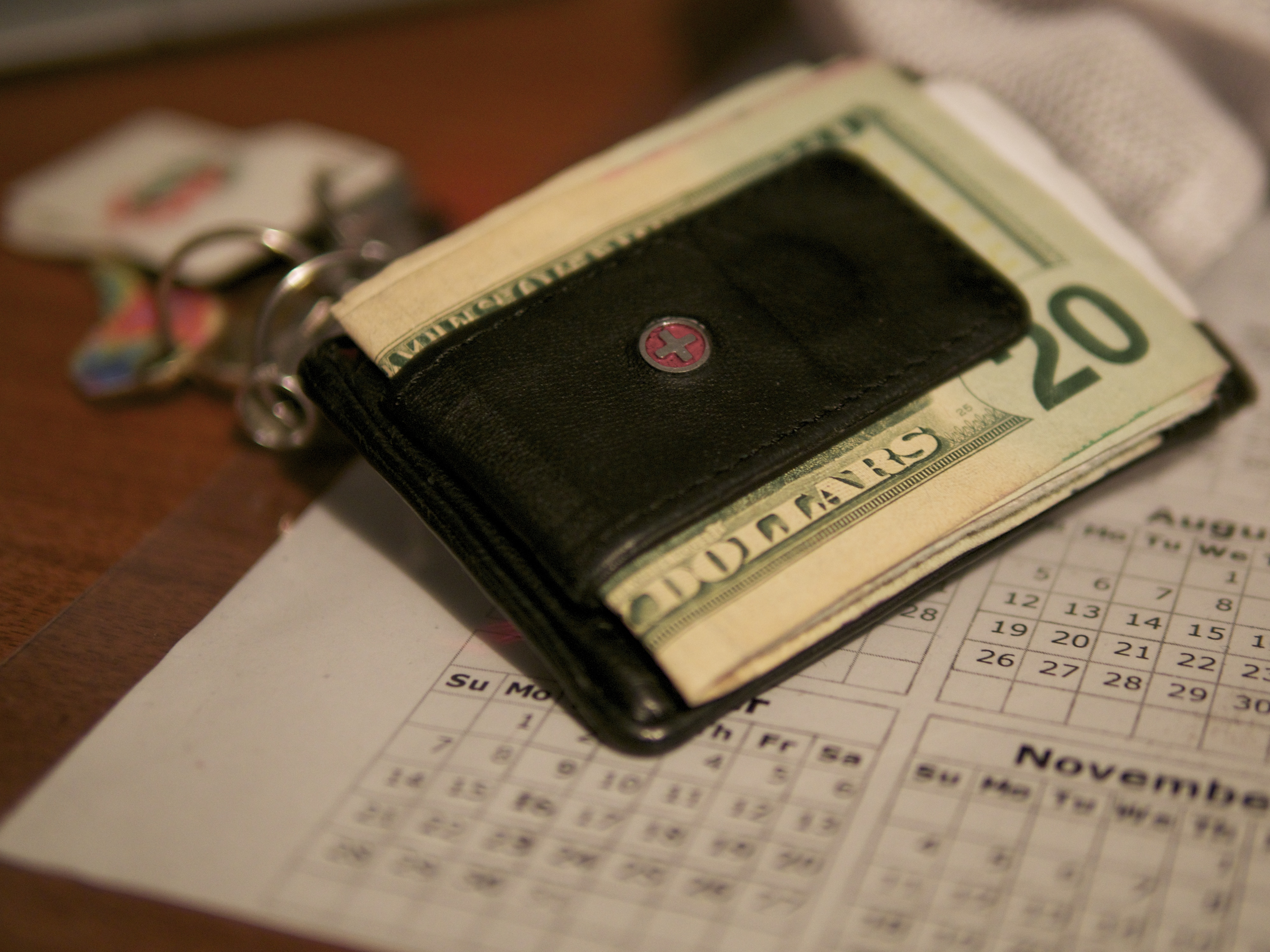
A black money clip holding United States dollars, with a United States twenty-dollar bill at the front.

A money clip is a device typically used to store cash and credit cards in a very compact fashion as an alternative to a conventional wallet.

== History ==
In Ancient Mesopotamia, clips were used to organize notes detailing the storage of grain. Similar clips were used in Japan for notes detailing rice storage during the Yayoi period.

The use of paper currency in Europe began in the 13th century. Europeans used clips and similar devices to secure banknotes to their clothing to deter pickpocketing. Money clips are still used today for this security advantage.

Modern money clips gained prominence in the United States in the 1900s as a fashion statement among wealthy men. Such clips were made from precious metals such as gold or silver. During the Great Depression, money clips lost popularity in favor of traditional wallets as open displays of wealth became unpopular.

== Varieties ==
=== Metal ===
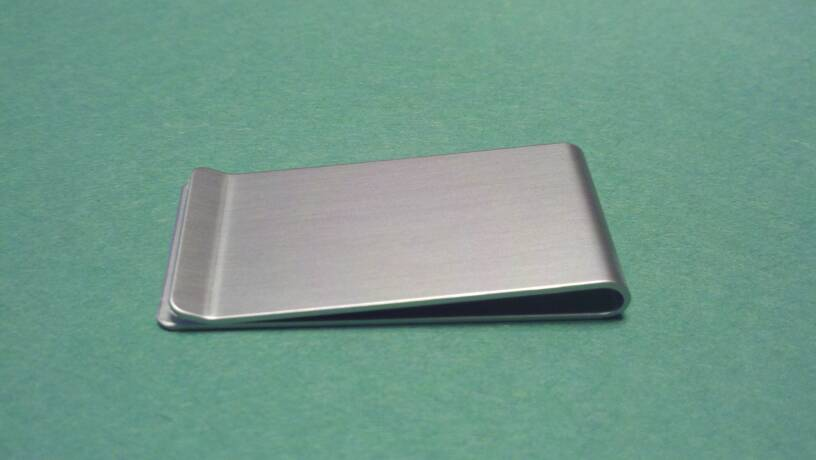
Metal money clip

A metal money clip is generally a solid piece of metal folded into half, such that the banknotes and credit cards are securely wedged in between the two metal pieces. Metal money clips are typically made out of brass, stainless steel, silver, gold, titanium, or platinum and are usually sold as luxury items. The main disadvantage of a metal money clip is that, due to the inflexibility of the metal, it cannot normally hold large amounts of cash. Depending on the design, it may also be difficult to push the banknotes into the clip.

=== Carbon fiber ===
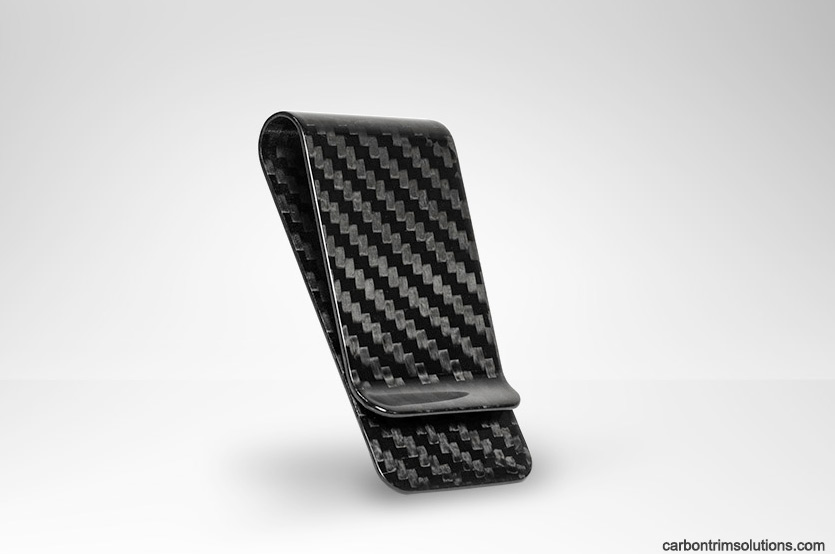
Carbon fiber money clip

Carbon fiber money clips are starting to see market acceptance. Using advanced moulding techniques, the high strength and durability of carbon fiber make for ideal qualities. The carbon fiber allows the clamping surfaces to open beyond parallel, without the deformation of normal metal money clips. However, it can be too loose when holding less, so there is a tradeoff. Being non-metallic, they still conduct electrical current, so they can be picked up by metal detectors. The softer resin (plastic which bonds the carbon fibers together) means that it gets scratched more easily than the tougher surface of metal money clip.

=== Magnetic ===
The magnetic money clip is generally made of two strong flat rectangular or round magnets encased in leather, with a small piece of leather separating the two pieces and allowing them to swivel into a closed and open position. There are also clips made of three magnets and two pieces of leather. A magnetic money clip typically has a greater carrying capacity than a metal money clip and the strongest clips are able to hold up to 15 banknotes folded in half. When holding a larger volume of banknotes, a magnetic money clip has less clamping force, since the magnets are further apart compared to when holding just a few banknotes. A metal or carbon fiber clip has inverse properties and the clamping tension gets higher as the clip is stretched open further. Magnetic money clips are not recommended for holding credit cards as the magnets may distort or erase the magnetic strip.

== Money clip wallet ==
A money clip wallet is a clip designed specifically to hold both credit cards and cash. The conventional money clip wallets are a credit card holder with either a swivel magnetic clip attached to the back side or a solid clip that is bent 6-fold; the conventional clip will feature three compartments instead of one. Money clip wallets are sometimes known as hybrid money clips.

== See also ==
- Wallet
