= Egede (crater) =

Crater on the Moon

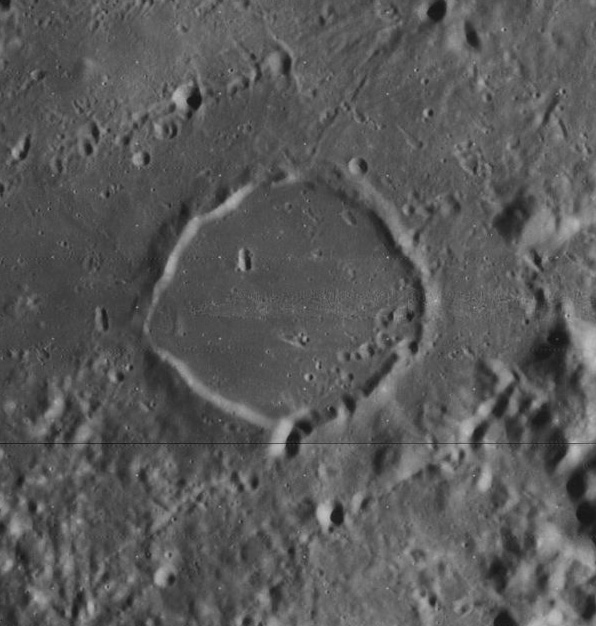
- Mosaic of Lunar Orbiter 4 images
- Coordinates: 48.7°N 10.6°E
- Diameter: 34.18 km (21.24 mi)
- Depth: Unknown
- Colongitude: 350° at sunrise
- Eponym: Hans Egede

Egede is the remains of a lunar impact crater that has been flooded by basalt, leaving only the somewhat polygonal circumference of the rim protruding just above the mare. It is located on the southern edge of the Mare Frigoris, mid way between Aristoteles crater to the west and Vallis Alpes to the east. To the southwest is an arc of low mountains curving between the rims of Aristoteles and Eudoxus.

This crater is roughly diamond shaped with low walls. The floor of Egede is flat and nearly featureless, except for a few tiny craterlets, including secondaries from Aristoteles (which are also present to the north and south of Egede). The surviving rim has a maximum altitude of 0.4 km above the surface.

This formation is named after Danish born Norwegian natural historian Hans Egede (1686-1758). His name was introduced into lunar nomenclature by J. H. von Mädler in 1837. Its designation was officially adopted by the International Astronomical Union in 1935.

== Satellite craters ==
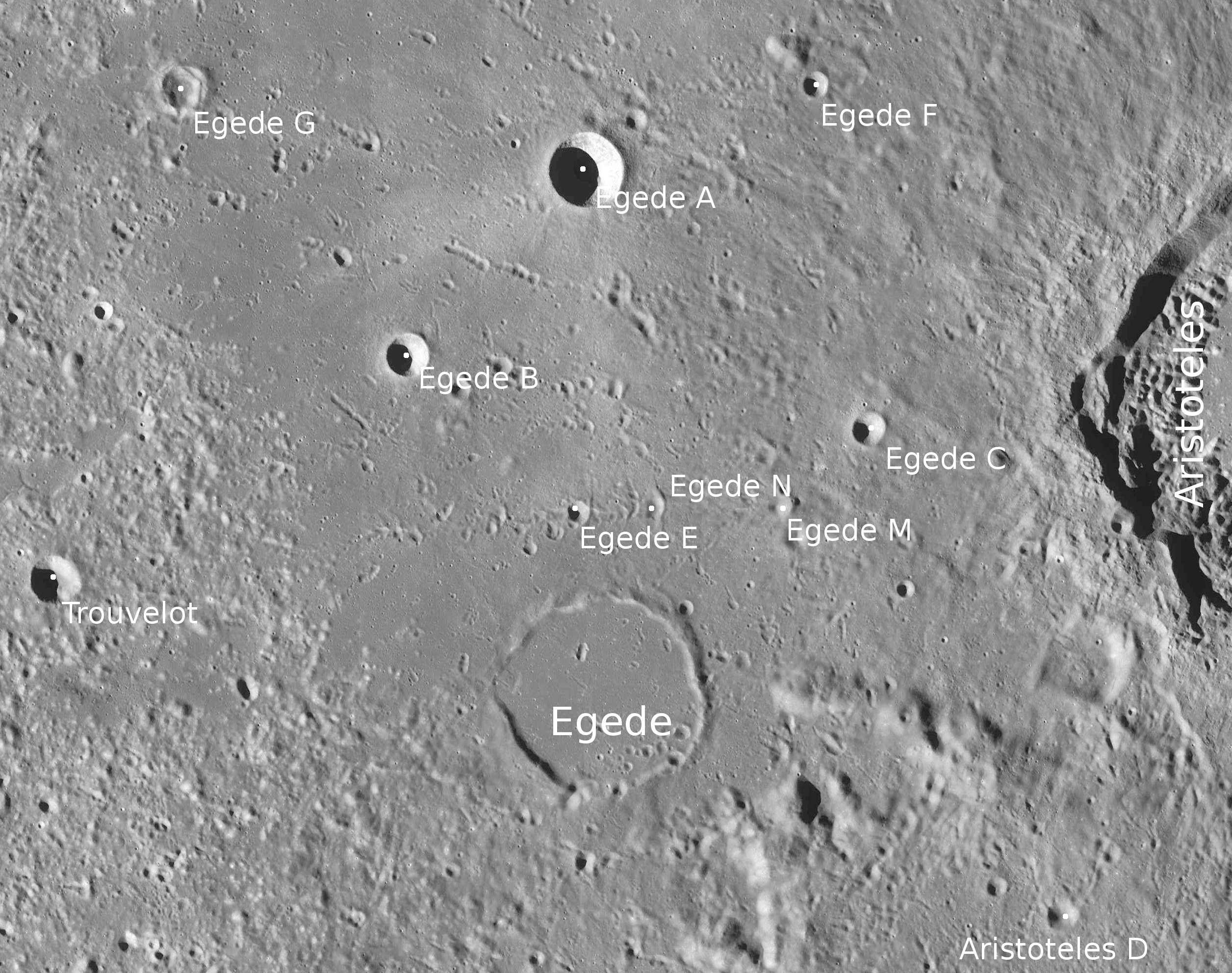
Satellite features of Egede

By convention these features are identified on lunar maps by placing the letter on the side of the crater midpoint that is closest to Egede.

Egede	Latitude	Longitude	Diameter
A	51.6° N	10.5° E	13 km
B	50.5° N	8.9° E	8 km
C	50.1° N	13.0° E	5 km
E	49.6° N	10.4° E	4 km
F	51.9° N	12.5° E	4 km
G	51.9° N	6.9° E	7 km
M	49.5° N	12.4° E	4 km
N	49.7° N	11.1° E	4 km
P	47.8° N	10.5° E	4 km

Egede A has an asymmetrical ray system with prominent rays to the north and south, and rays to the west being denser than those to the east. Egede G is a concentric (double-walled) crater.

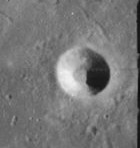
Lunar Orbiter 4 image of Egede B
