= Montes Caucasus =

Mountain range on the Moon

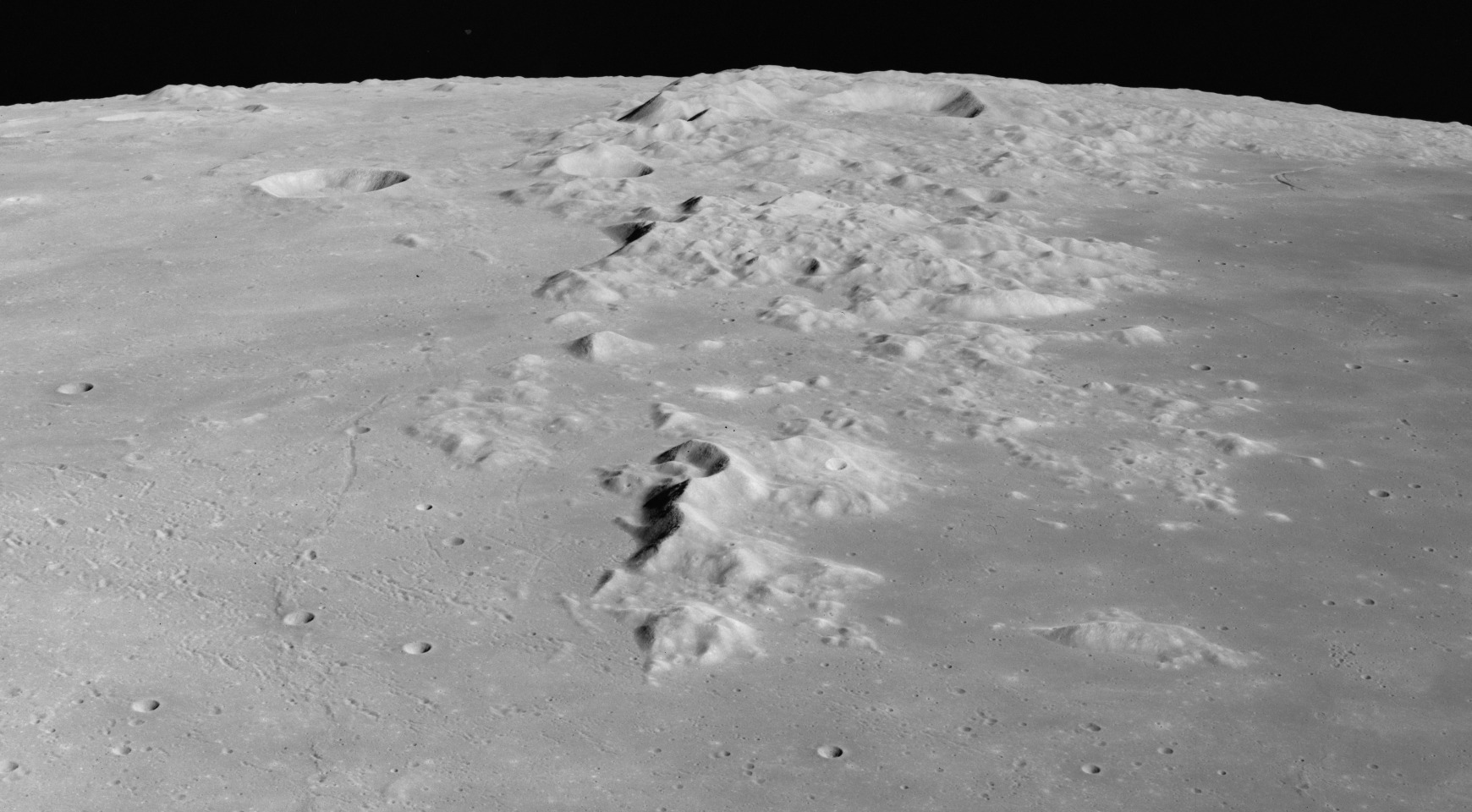
- Oblique view facing north from 106 km altitude of the southern Montes Caucasus, from Apollo 15

Highest point
- Listing: Lunar mountains
- Coordinates: 38.4°N 10.0°E

Geography
- Location: the Moon

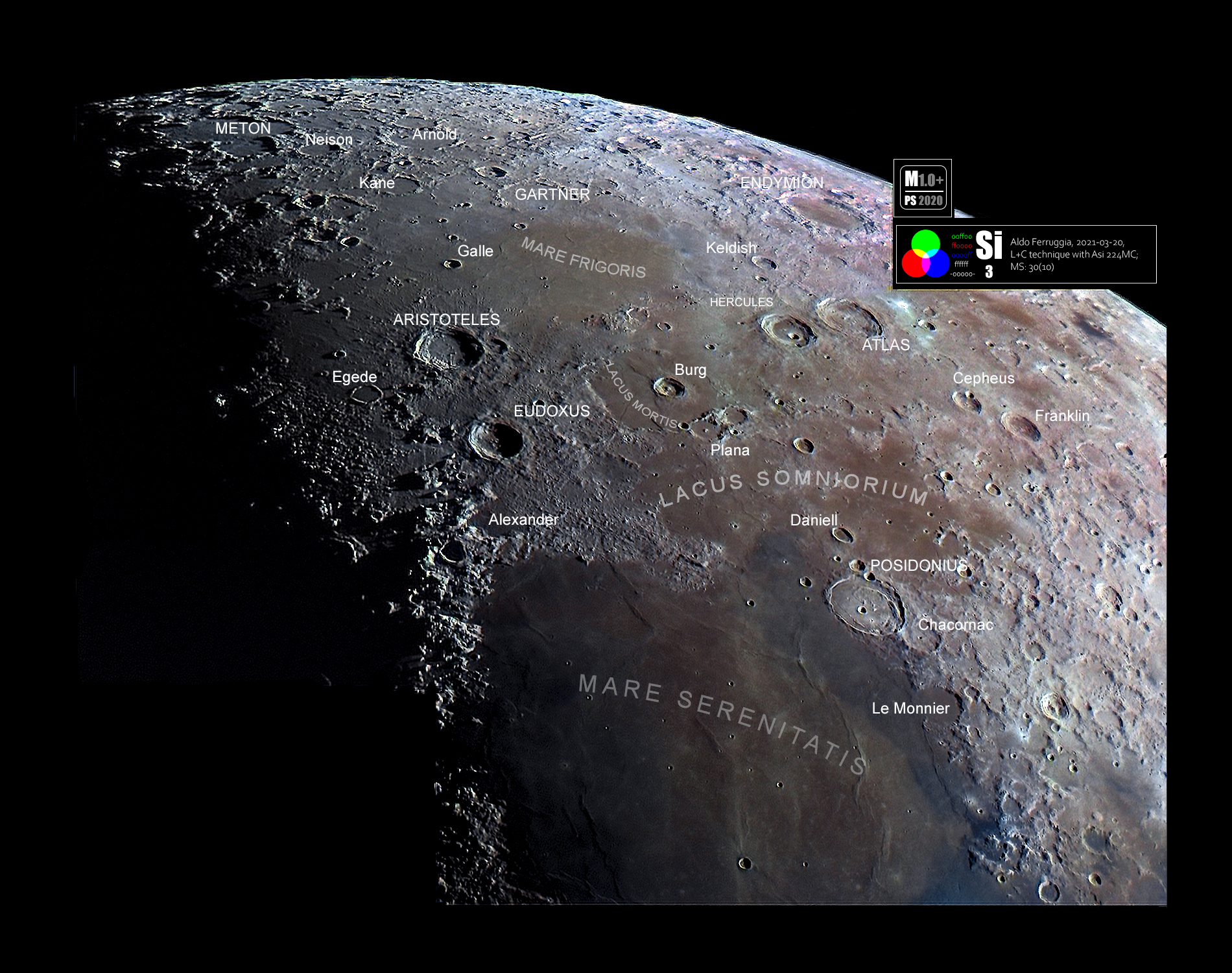
Montes Caucasus and closer structures with mineral postprocessing

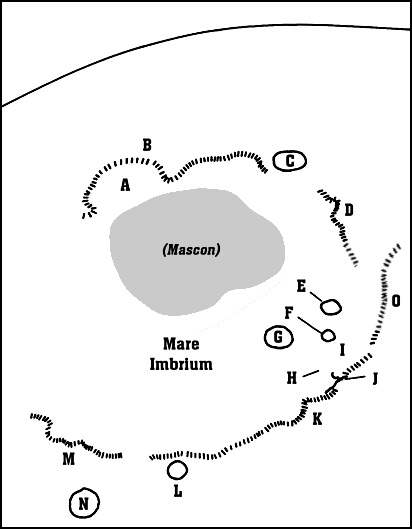
Detail map of Mare Imbrium's features. Montes Caucasus is marked "O".

Montes Caucasus is a rugged range of mountains in the northeastern part of the Moon. It begins at a gap of level surface that joins the Mare Imbrium to the west with the Mare Serenitatis to the east, and extends in an irregular band to the north-northeast to the western side of the prominent crater Eudoxus. The range forms the northwestern boundary of the Mare Serenitatis. It forms a continuation of the Montes Apenninus range to the southwest.

There are several breaks in the range where nearby lunar mare has intruded into the formation, particularly near the southern tip. Embedded within the eastern flank of the range is the crater Calippus. Along the eastern flank to the south of Eudoxus is the remnants of the crater Alexander.

The range has a diameter of 445 km. Its tallest peaks reach heights of 6 km.

The range was named after the Caucasus Mountains on Earth by the German selenographer Johann H. Mädler. None of the individual peaks have been assigned individual names.

== West of Lamèch and satellite crater Eudoxus D ==
During full moon, as seen from earth, a distinct bright 'L' or steel square shaped appearance could be observed in the section of Montes Caucasus immediately west of crater Lamèch and satellite crater Eudoxus D, west-southwest of Eudoxus itself. Although captured during high sun, the bright 'L' shape is not noticeable on the photographic version of chart LAC 26 (page 52) in The Clementine Atlas of the Moon (Ben Bussey / Paul D. Spudis). The shadowless photographs made by the Lunar Reconnaissance Orbiter (LRO) also show nothing comparable with a distinct 'L' shaped appearance. It is an optical phenomenon only seen from earth.

== See also ==
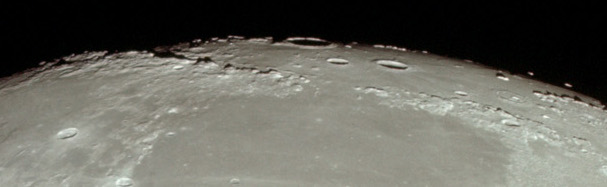
View of the limb of the moon showing Montes Apenninus (left), Montes Caucasus (right), eastern Mare Imbrium (top), and western Mare Serenitatis (bottom), from Apollo 11

- List of mountains on the Moon
