= Lamèch (crater) =

Crater on the Moon

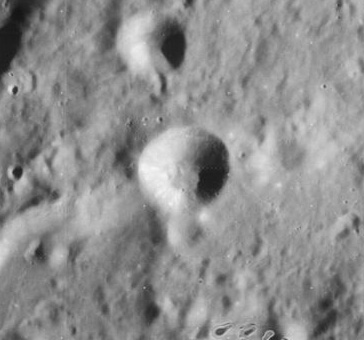
- Lunar Orbiter 4 image. Crater Lamèch and satellite crater Eudoxus D north of it.
- Coordinates: 42.7°N 13.1°E
- Diameter: 13 km
- Depth: 1.5 km
- Colongitude: 347° at sunrise
- Eponym: Félix Chemla Lamèch

Lamèch is a small lunar impact crater that is located to the southwest of the prominent crater Eudoxus, at the eastern edge of the Montes Caucasus range. It was named after French selenographer Félix Chemla Lamèch. This is a circular, bowl-shaped formation. The inner walls slope down to a small central floor that is about one-fourth the diameter of the crater. This formation is not notably eroded, and contains no other features of interest.

== West of Lamèch and satellite crater Eudoxus D ==
During full moon, as seen from earth, a distinct bright 'L' or steel square shaped appearance could be observed in the section of Montes Caucasus immediately west of Lamèch and satellite crater Eudoxus D, west-southwest of Eudoxus itself. Although captured during high sun, the bright 'L' shape is not noticeable on the photographic version of chart LAC 26 (page 52) in The Clementine Atlas of the Moon (Ben Bussey / Paul D. Spudis). The shadowless photographs made by the Lunar Reconnaissance Orbiter (LRO) also show nothing comparable with a distinct 'L' shaped appearance. It is an optical phenomenon only seen from earth.
