= Eudoxus (lunar crater) =

Crater on the Moon

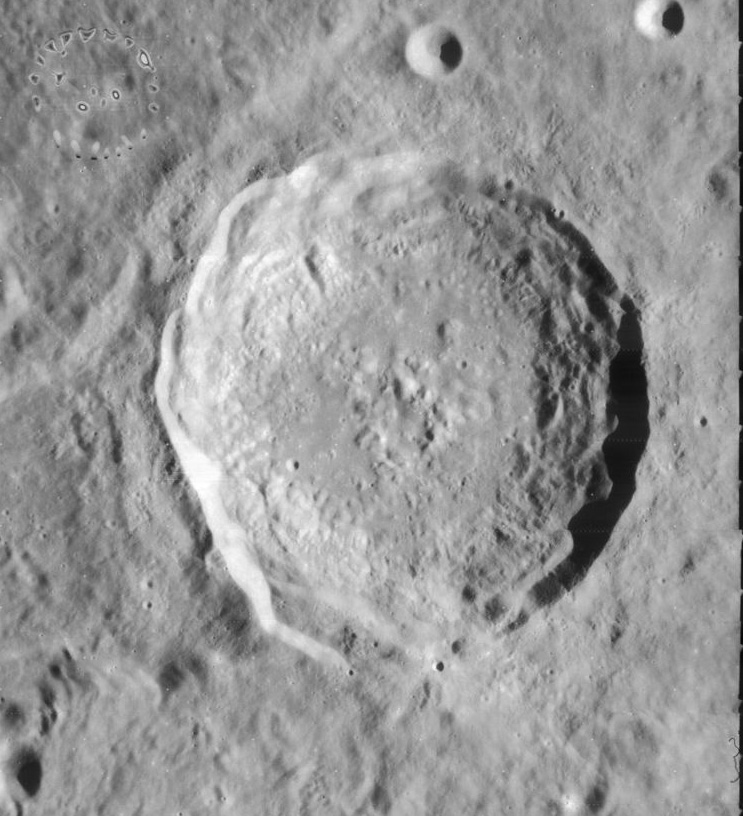
- Lunar Orbiter 4 image
- Coordinates: 44.3°N 16.3°E
- Diameter: 70.16 km (43.60 mi)
- Depth: 3.4 km (2.1 mi)
- Colongitude: 344° at sunrise
- Formation: Copernican
- Eponym: Eudoxus of Cnidus

Eudoxus is a prominent lunar impact crater that lies to the east of the northern tip of the Montes Caucasus range. It is located to the south of the prominent crater Aristoteles in the northern regions of the visible Moon, to which it bears some resemblance. To the south is the ruined formation of Alexander, and the small crater Lamèch lies to the southwest.

The rim of Eudoxus has a series of terraces on the interior wall, and slightly worn ramparts about the exterior. It reaches a height of 3.4 km above the surroundings. The crater lacks a single central peak, but has a cluster of low hills about the midpoint of the floor. The infrared spectrum of pure crystalline plagioclase has been identified on these rises. The remainder of the interior floor is relatively level. Eudoxus has a ray system, and is consequently mapped as part of the Copernican System.

This formation is named after the Greek astronomer Eudoxus of Cnidus (c. 408–355 B.C.). His name was incorporated with the lunar nomenclature of Italian astronomer Giovanni B. Riccioli in 1651. Its designation was formally adopted by the International Astronomical Union in 1935.

== Bright satellite crater Eudoxus A during full moon ==
East-northeast of Eudoxus, the bright bowl-shaped satellite crater Eudoxus A is an eye-catcher during full moon. The brightness of Eudoxus A is also noticeable on the photographic version of chart LAC 26 (page 52) in The Clementine Atlas of the Moon (Ben Bussey / Paul D. Spudis).

== West of satellite crater Eudoxus D and Lamèch ==
During full moon, as seen from earth, a distinct bright 'L' or steel square shaped appearance could be observed in the section of Montes Caucasus immediately west of satellite crater Eudoxus D and Lamèch, west-southwest of Eudoxus itself. Although captured during high sun, the bright 'L' shape is not noticeable on the photographic version of chart LAC 26 (page 52) in The Clementine Atlas of the Moon. The shadowless photographs made by the Lunar Reconnaissance Orbiter (LRO) also show nothing comparable with a distinct 'L' shaped appearance. It is an optical phenomenon only seen from earth.

== Gallery ==
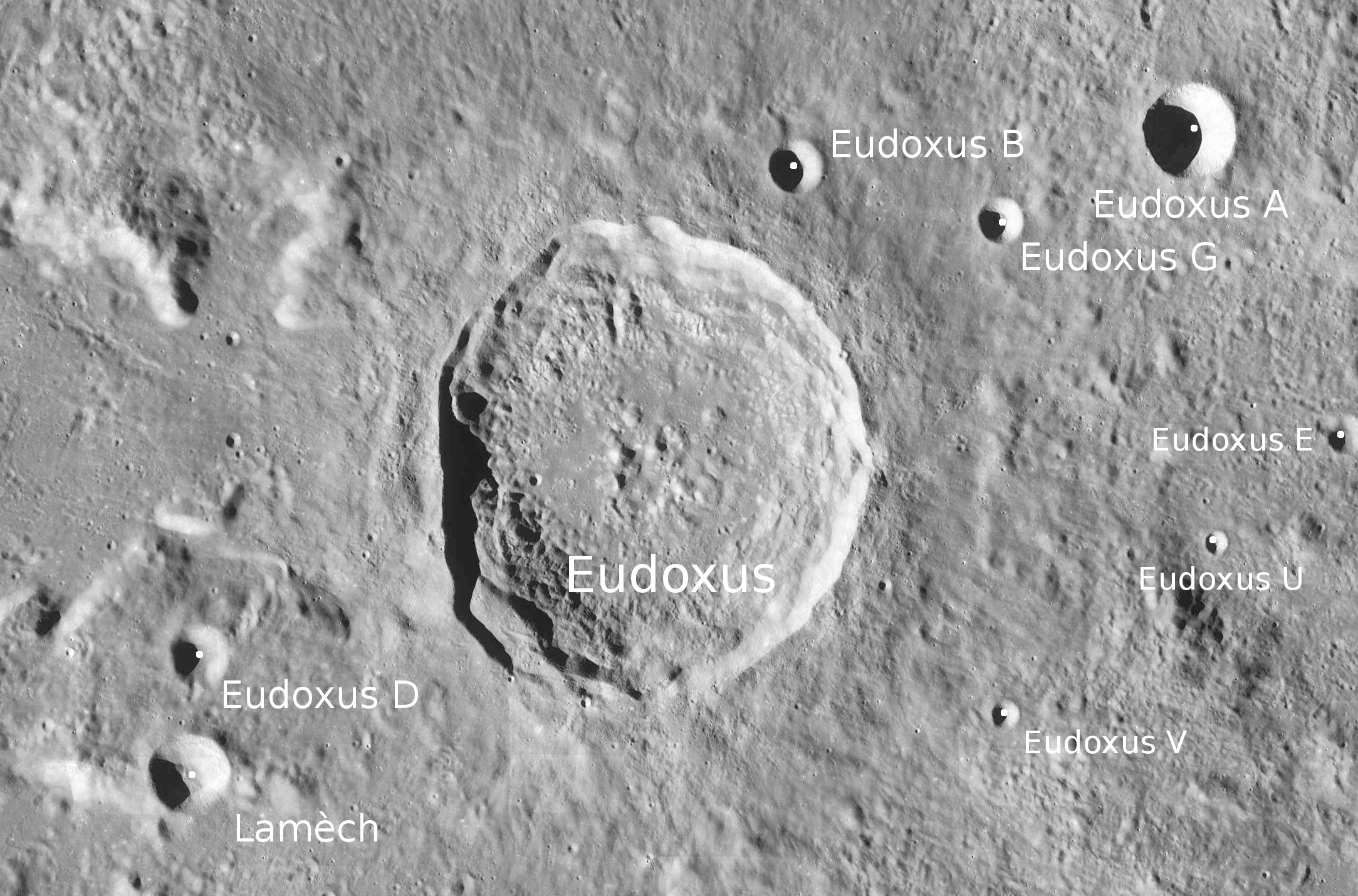
Eudoxus crater and its satellites from a LRO image

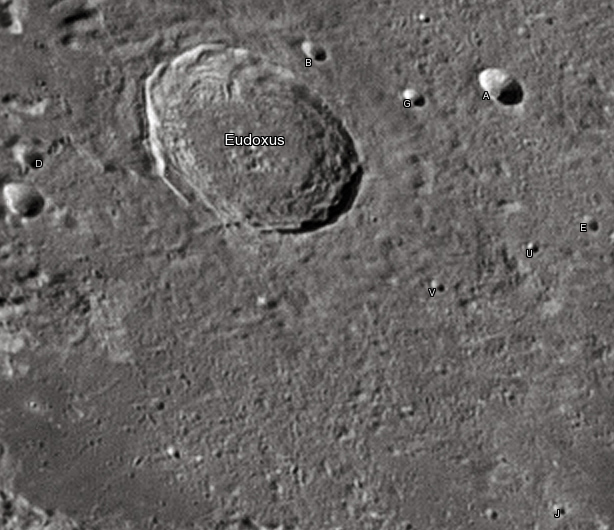
Eudoxus crater and vicinity, taken from Earth

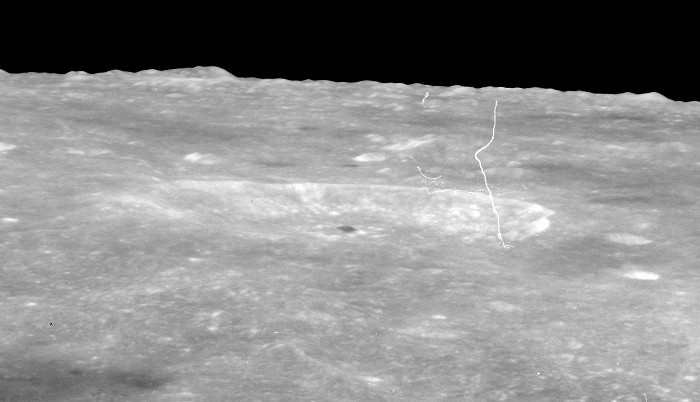
Oblique view from Apollo 16

== Satellite craters ==
By convention these features are identified on lunar maps by placing the letter on the side of the crater midpoint that is closest to Eudoxus.

Eudoxus	Latitude	Longitude	Diameter
A	45.8° N	20.0° E	14 km
B	45.6° N	17.4° E	8 km
D	43.3° N	13.2° E	10 km
E	44.3° N	21.1° E	6 km
G	45.4° N	18.8° E	7 km
J	40.8° N	20.2° E	4 km
U	43.9° N	20.3° E	4 km
V	43.1° N	18.9° E	4 km
