= Mitchell (crater) =

Crater on the Moon

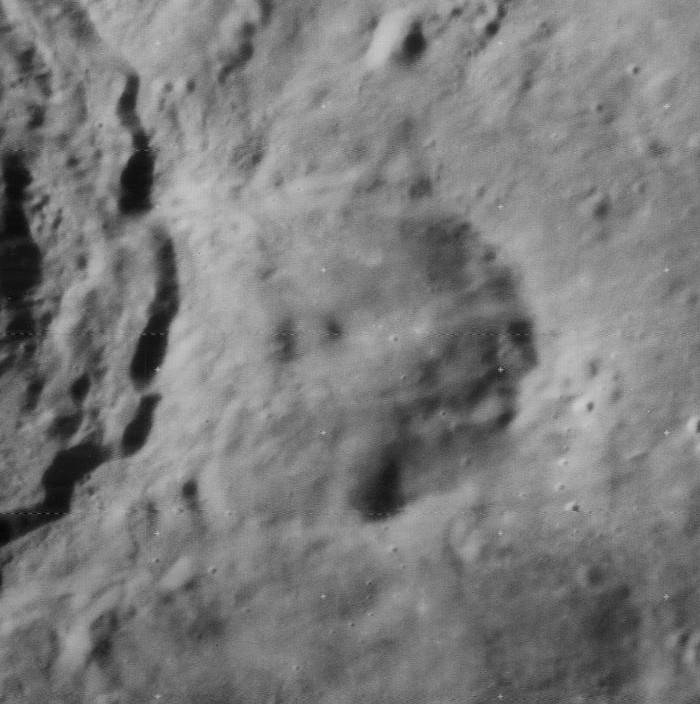
- Lunar Orbiter 4 image of Mitchell, with rim of Aristoteles at left
- Coordinates: 49.7°N 20.2°E
- Diameter: 30 km
- Depth: 1.3 km
- Colongitude: 340° at sunrise
- Eponym: Maria Mitchell

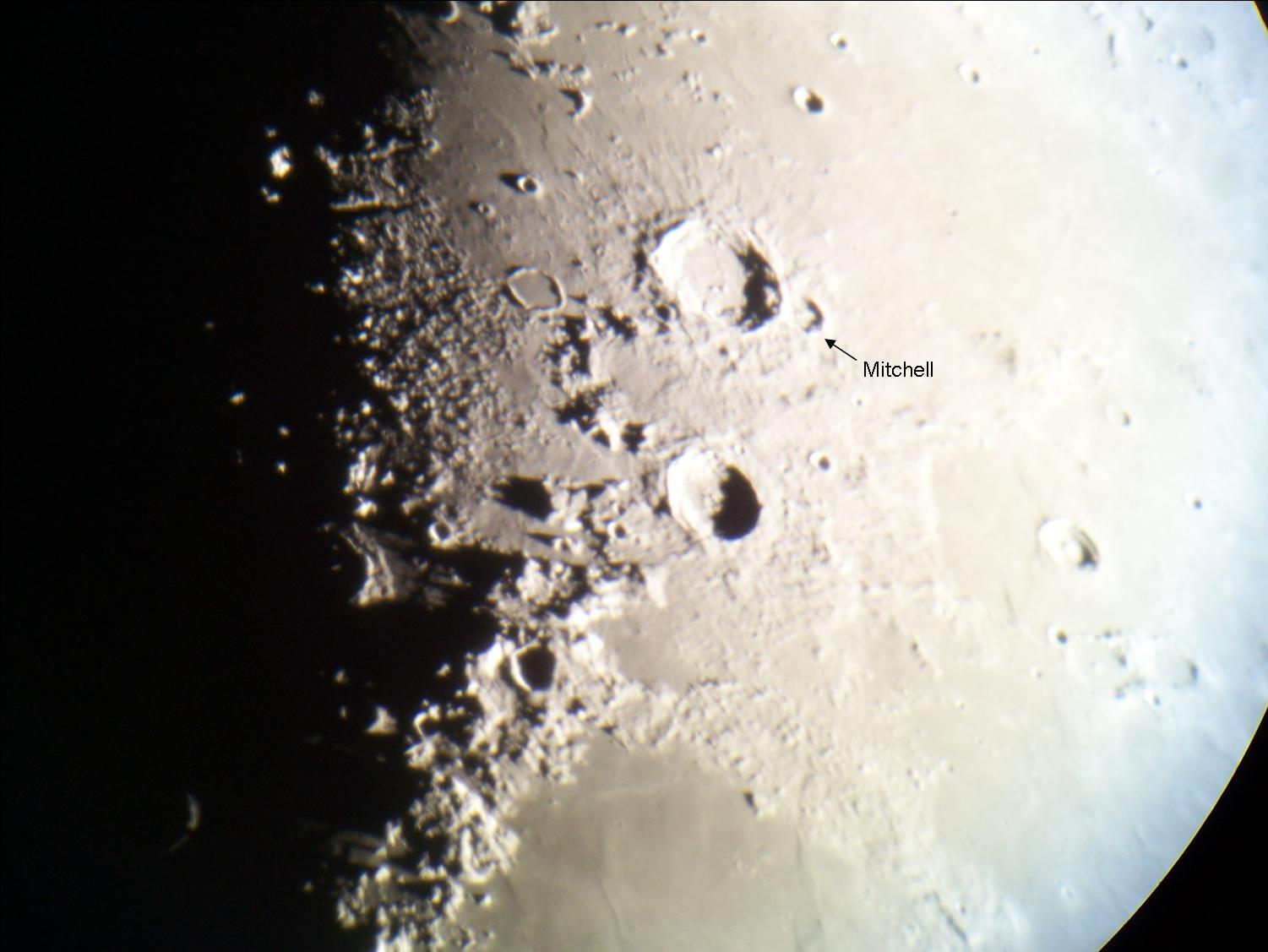
Location of the lunar crater Mitchell

Mitchell is a lunar impact crater, which is attached to the eastern rim of the larger and more prominent crater Aristoteles. It was named after American astronomer Maria Mitchell. The floor of Mitchell is rough and irregular, with a low central rise, being partially filled with the ejecta of the younger Aristoteles. There is a slight notch in the southern rim, and the western wall has been completely absorbed by the rim of Aristoteles.

== Features ==
It is characterised by an extremely high rockfall density by lunar standards.

== Satellite craters ==
By convention these features are identified on lunar maps by placing the letter on the side of the crater midpoint which is closest to Mitchell.

Feature	Latitude	Longitude	Diameter	Ref
Mitchell B	48.3° N	19.3° E	5.4 km	WGPSN
Mitchell E	47.6° N	21.7° E	7.72 km	WGPSN

== See also ==
- 1455 Mitchella, asteroid
- Maria Mitchell Observatory
