= Straightedge =

Tool used for drawing straight lines, or checking their straightness or flatness

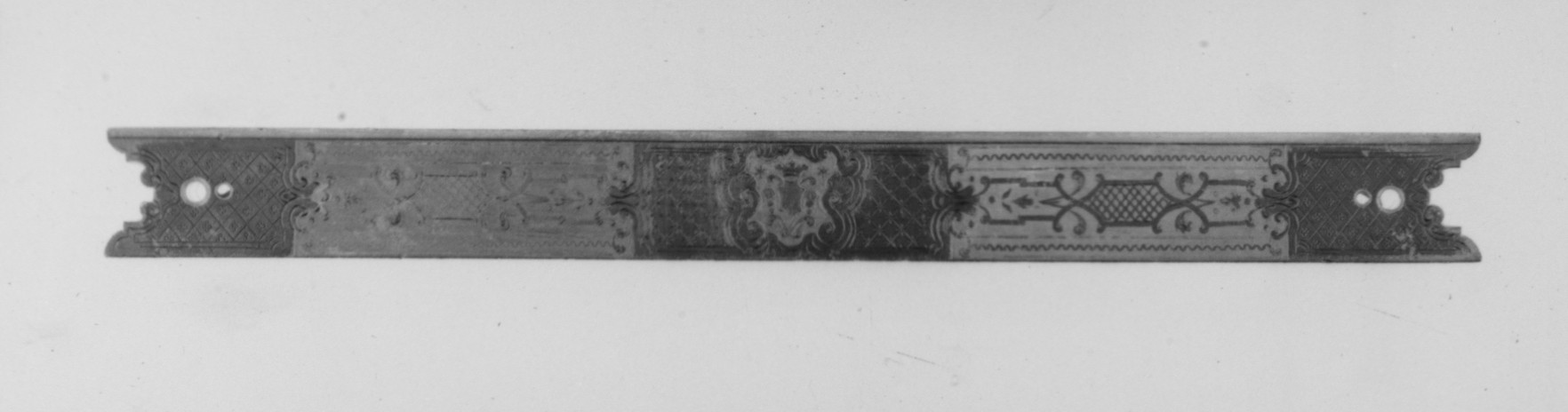
An ornate 18th century iron straightedge

A straightedge or straight edge is a tool used for drawing straight lines, or checking their straightness. If it has equally spaced markings along its length, it is usually called a ruler.

Straightedges are used in the automotive service and machining industry to check the flatness of machined mating surfaces. They are also used in the decorating industry for cutting and hanging wallpaper.

True straightness can in some cases be checked by using a laser line level as an optical straightedge: it can illuminate an accurately straight line on a flat surface such as the edge of a plank or shelf.

A pair of straightedges called winding sticks are used in woodworking to make warping easier to perceive in pieces of wood.

Three straight edges can be used to test and calibrate themselves to a certain extent, however this procedure does not control twist. For accurate calibration of a straight edge, a surface plate must be used.

== Compass-and-straightedge construction ==
An idealized straightedge is used in compass-and-straightedge constructions in plane geometry.

It may be used:

- Given two points, to draw the line connecting them
- Given a point and a circle, to draw either tangent
- Given two circles, to draw any of their common tangents
- Or any of the other numerous geometric constructions

The idealized straightedge is:

- Infinitely long
- Infinitesimally thin (i.e. point width)
- Always assumed to be without graduations or marks, or the ability to mark
- Able to be aligned to two points with infinite precision to draw a line through them

It may not be marked or used together with the compass so as to transfer the length of one segment to another.

It is possible to do all compass and straightedge constructions without the straightedge. That is, it is possible, using only a compass, to find the intersection of two lines given two points on each, and to find the tangent points to circles. It is not, however, possible to do all constructions using only a straightedge. It is possible to do them with straightedge alone given a circle and its center.

== See also ==
- Chalk line
- Geometrography
- Parallel rulers
- Parallel (engineering)
