= Winding stick =

Woodworking tool

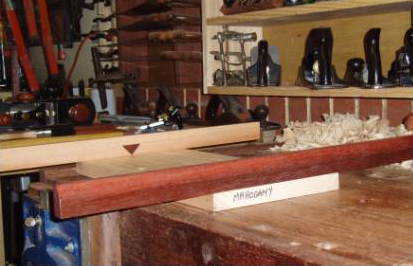
Winding sticks in use.

In woodworking and carpentry, a pair of winding sticks is a tool that aids in viewing twist (also known as wind) in pieces of lumber by amplifying the defect. Winding sticks can be as simple as any two straight sticks or they can be elegant, decorated, dimensionally stable wood like mahogany. A pair of framing squares may also be suitable. Traditionally they are 16 inches (41 cm) to 30 inches (76 cm) long, 1 3/4 inches (44 mm) tall and tapered in their height from 3/8 inch (9.5 mm) to 1/8 inch (3.2 mm). The longer the winding sticks, the more they will amplify the wind. It is common for a woodworker to make a matching pair for the purpose, and contrasting colors of woods improve the discernability of differences in level between the two sticks as they are compared.

One winding stick is placed on one end of the piece and the second winding stick is placed on the other end, parallel in plan view to the first. The woodworker then stands back a short distance and sights across the top of the two sticks. If the surface on which the sticks are sitting is flat (in the same plane), the top edges of the two sticks can be seen to be aligned and parallel to each other; even small amounts of misalignment can easily be seen using this method. Adjustments to the surface of the board are then made (e.g., with a hand plane) if correction is necessary. This process is repeated all across the piece until the piece is satisfactorily true. Longitudinally the piece is checked with a straightedge.

Winding sticks are generally planed parallel back to back to ensure they are true; this is why it is important to use the sticks with the inlay facing one another. They are not dependent on being the same height along their length; the critical element is that they are parallel to each other and then used in that configuration.

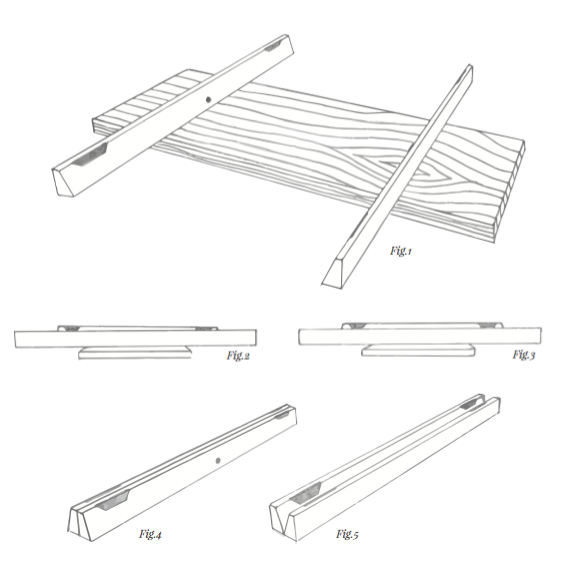
Sticks are used facing one another (top). When aligned for planing, they can be placed back to back (bottom left) or face to face (bottom right).

Every workshop has a different climate, and it is advisable to check from time to time that a pair of sticks are still true. If it is found that they require adjustment, it is a straightforward task to correct. Firstly the soles are checked to be flat; a long shooting board is recommended for the job. Next align both sticks either back to back or face to face, whichever is easiest to secure, then take light passes over the tops with a hand plane until even shavings are produced from both sticks. They are now parallel.
