= 1455 Mitchella =

Main-belt asteroid

Discovery
- Discovered by: A. Bohrmann
- Discovery site: Heidelberg Obs.
- Discovery date: 5 June 1937

Designations
- Named after: Maria Mitchell (American astronomer)
- Alternative designations: 1937 LF · 1947 LB; 1978 QR_{3}
- Minor planet category: main-belt · (inner); Flora · background

Orbital characteristics
- Epoch 4 September 2017 (JD 2458000.5)
- Uncertainty parameter 0
- Observation arc: 79.81 yr (29,152 days)
- Aphelion: 2.5273 AU
- Perihelion: 1.9665 AU
- Semi-major axis: 2.2469 AU
- Eccentricity: 0.1248
- Orbital period (sidereal): 3.37 yr (1,230 days)
- Mean anomaly: 321.18°
- Mean motion: 0° 17^{m} 33.36^{s} / day
- Inclination: 7.7548°
- Longitude of ascending node: 128.33°
- Argument of perihelion: 100.60°

Physical characteristics
- Dimensions: 6.449±0.170 km 6.55±1.51 km 6.646±0.102 km 7.00±1.56 km 7.47 km (calculated)
- Synodic rotation period: 118.7±0.5 h (Note: Higgins (2011) web: rotation period 118.7±0.5 hours with a brightness amplitude of 0.60 mag. Summary figures for (1455) Mitchella at LCDB and David Higgins' archived website)
- Geometric albedo: 0.24 (assumed); 0.26±0.12; 0.31±0.17; 0.3333±0.0453; 0.353±0.097
- Spectral type: S (assumed)
- Absolute magnitude (H): 12.7 · 12.80 · 13.03 · 13.27±0.31

1455 Mitchella, provisional designation 1937 LF, is a Florian asteroid, slow rotator and suspected tumbler from the inner regions of the asteroid belt, approximately 7 kilometers in diameter. It was discovered on 5 June 1937, by astronomer Alfred Bohrmann at the Heidelberg-Königstuhl State Observatory in southwest Germany. The asteroid was named after American astronomer Maria Mitchell.

== Orbit and classification ==
Mitchella is a non-family asteroid of the main belt's background population when applying the Hierarchical Clustering Method to its proper orbital elements. It has also been classified as a member of the Flora family (402), a giant asteroid family and the largest family of stony asteroids in the main-belt.

It orbits the Sun in the inner main-belt at a distance of 2.0–2.5 AU once every 3 years and 4 months (1,230 days). Its orbit has an eccentricity of 0.12 and an inclination of 8° with respect to the ecliptic. The body's observation arc begins at Heidelberg, one month after its official discovery observation.

== Physical characteristics ==
Mitchella is an assumed stony S-type asteroid, which is also the overall spectral type for members of the Flora family.

=== Rotation period ===
In June 2006, a rotational lightcurve of Mitchella was obtained from photometric observations by Australian astronomer David Higgins at the Hunters Hill Observatory (E14). Lightcurve analysis gave a rotation period of 118.7 hours with a brightness variation of 0.60 magnitude (U=2+). With a period above 100 hours, Mitchella is one of few hundred slow rotators currently known to exists. Its high brightness amplitude is indicative for a somewhat elongated shape. Also, the photometric observations suggested that it might be in a tumbling motion.

=== Diameter and albedo ===
According to the survey carried out by the NEOWISE mission of NASA's Wide-field Infrared Survey Explorer, Mitchella measures between 6.449 and 7.00 kilometers in diameter and its surface has an albedo between 0.26 and 0.353.

The Collaborative Asteroid Lightcurve Link assumes an albedo of 0.24 – derived from 8 Flora, the Flora family's parent body – and calculates a diameter of 7.47 kilometers based on an absolute magnitude of 12.8.

== Naming ==
This minor planet was named after Maria Mitchell (1818–1889), an American professor of astronomy and director of Vassar College Observatory. The official naming citation was mentioned in The Names of the Minor Planets by Paul Herget in 1955 (H 131). The lunar crater Mitchell is also named in her honor, as is the Maria Mitchell Observatory in, Massachusetts, United States.
