= Aristoteles (crater) =

Crater on the Moon

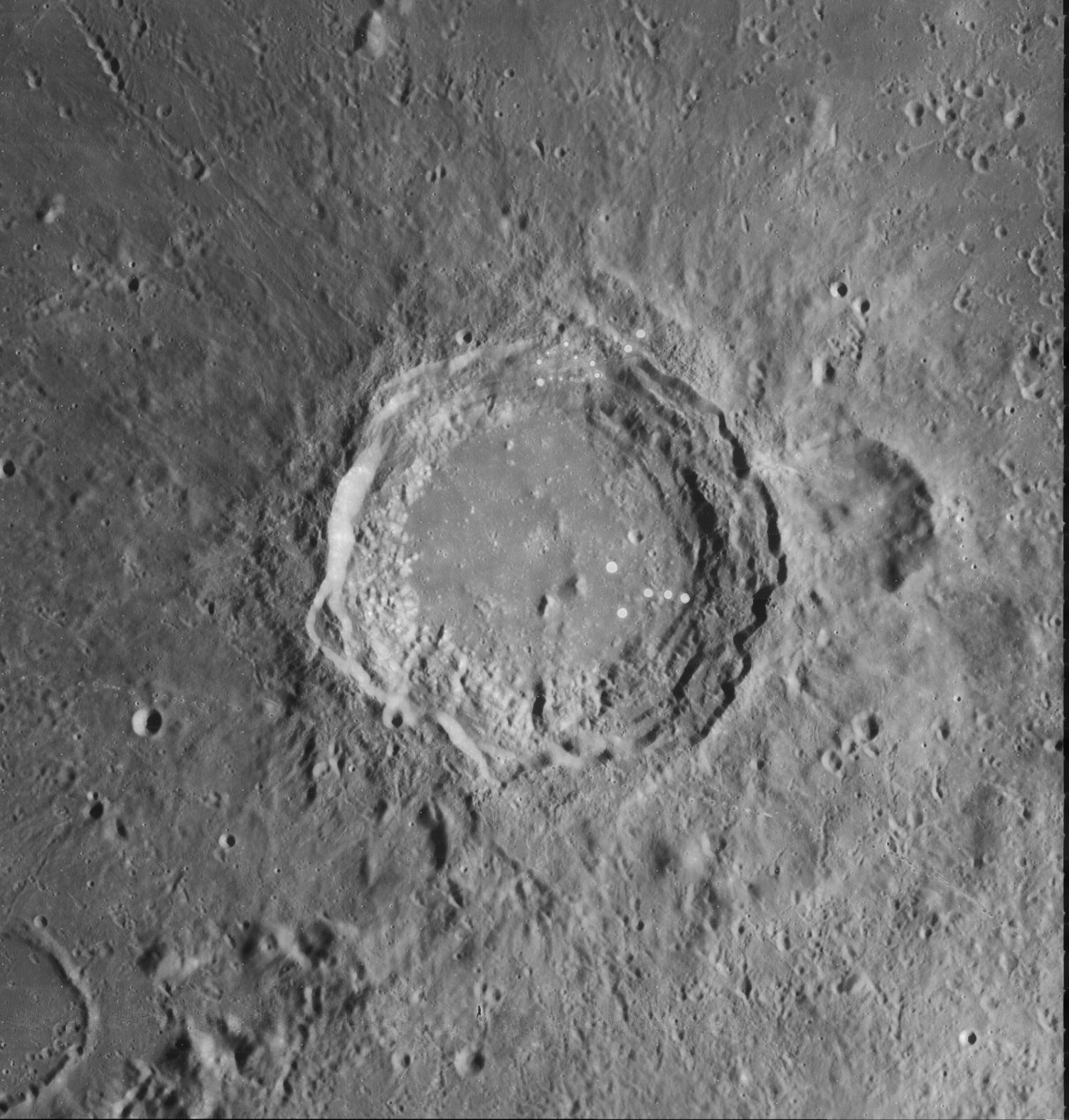
- Lunar Orbiter 4 image of Aristoteles (large crater) and Mitchell (smaller one to the right)
- Coordinates: 50.2°N 17.4°E
- Diameter: 87.57 km (54.41 mi)
- Depth: 3.5 km (2.2 mi)
- Colongitude: 343° at sunrise
- Formation: Eratosthenian
- Eponym: Aristotle

Aristoteles is a lunar impact crater that lies near the southern edge of the Mare Frigoris and to the east of the Montes Alpes mountain range. It was officially named in 1935 after the ancient Greek philosopher and astronomer Aristotle (383-322 B.C.) by the International Astronomical Union, using the classical form of his name. This designation was introduced into lunar nomenclature by Italian astronomer Giovanni Ricciolli in 1651.

To the immediate south of Aristoteles lies the slightly smaller crater Eudoxus, and these two form a distinctive pair for a telescope observer. An arc of mountains between these craters bends to the west before joining the walls. The smaller crater Mitchell is directly attached to the eastern rim of Aristoteles. To the west is the low, flooded feature Egede.

On the lunar geologic timescale, Aristoteles is a crater of Eratosthenian age. Observers have noted the crater wall of Aristoteles is slightly distorted into a rounded hexagon shape. The inner walls are wide and finely terraced. It is characterised by an extremely high rockfall density by lunar standards. The outer ramparts display a generally radial structure of hillocks through the extensive blanket of ejecta.

The crater floor is uneven and covered in hilly ripples. Aristoteles does possess small central peaks but they are somewhat offset to the south. The spectra of the central peak fits an olivine-bearing noritic gabbro mineralogy originating from a depth of 8.7 to 13.8 km. The interior floor appears to have been filled with a 1 km thick layer of material partially burying these projections.

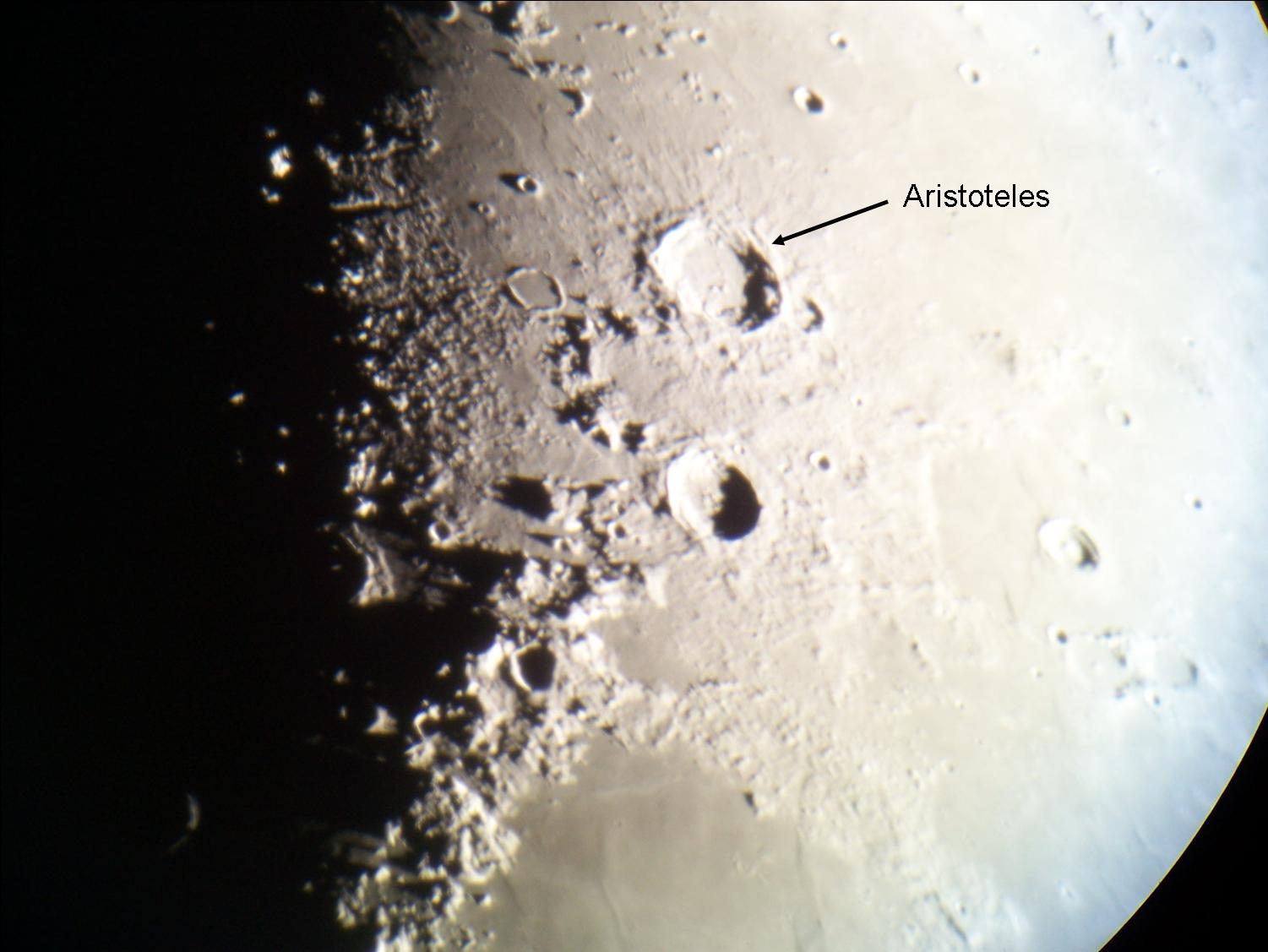
Location of Aristoteles as photographed at the McDonald Observatory

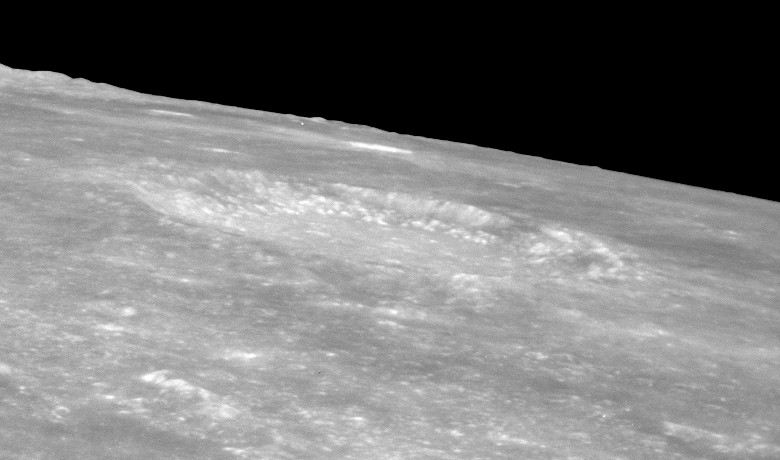
Oblique view from Apollo 16

== Satellite craters ==
By convention these features are identified on lunar maps by placing the letter on the side of the crater midpoint that is closest to Aristoteles.

Aristoteles	Latitude	Longitude	Diameter
D	47.5° N	14.7° E	6 km
M	53.5° N	27.2° E	7 km
N	52.9° N	26.8° E	5 km
