= Alexander (crater) =

Crater on the Moon

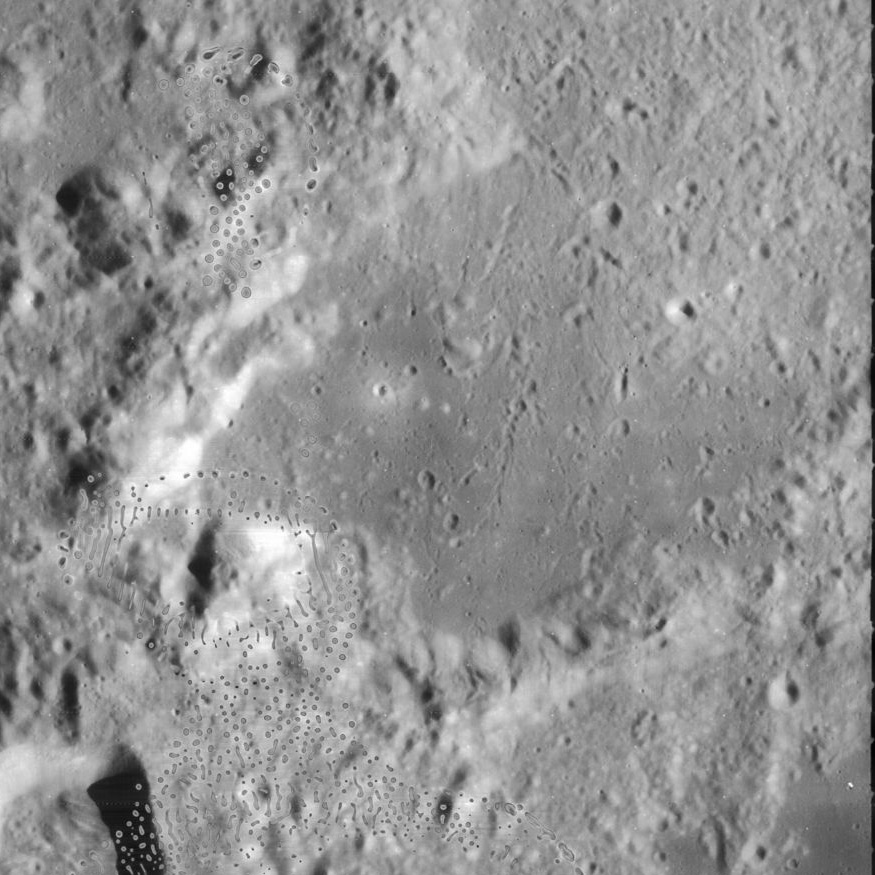
- Lunar Orbiter 4 image (spots are blemishes on original image). Crater in lower left corner is Calippus.
- Coordinates: 40.3°N 13.5°E
- Diameter: 94.80 km
- Depth: 410 m
- Colongitude: 347° at sunrise
- Formation: pre-Imbrian
- Eponym: Alexander the Great

Alexander is a lunar impact crater-like feature east of Montes Caucasus, in the rugged surface to the north of Mare Serenitatis. This depression dates to the pre-Imbrian epoch, while the mare-covered floor is from the Imbrian period. Alexander lies to the south-southwest of the prominent crater Eudoxus, and to the east-northeast of Calippus.

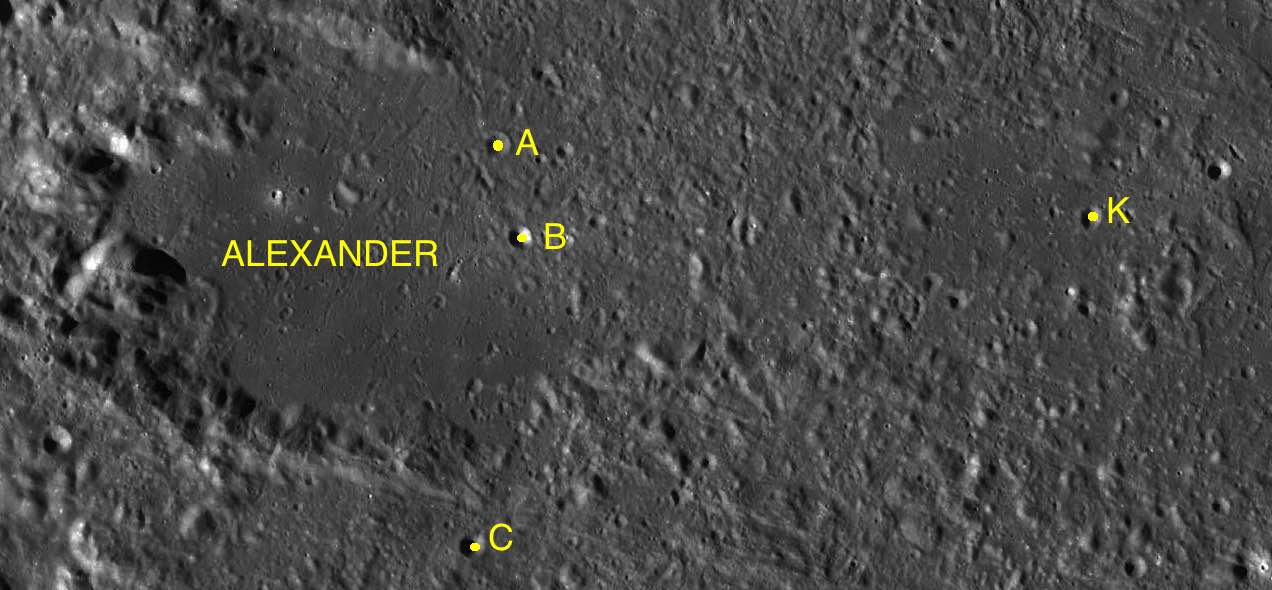
Satellite craters of Alexander

If this ever was an impact crater, the Alexander formation has been so heavily worn and distorted with the passage of time that it now resembles little more than a lowland region enclosed by rugged ranges. The rim segments lie along the northwest, west, and south sections of the depression, while the eastern side stands open to the surrounding surface. The surviving walls are nearly rectangular in form, with the most prominent mounts in the northwest.

The floor is more smooth and has a darker albedo in the western half, and gradually grows lighter and more impacted toward the east. It has a number of small hills. There are no craters of significance within the perimeter of this formation, although there are tiny craterlets aplenty in the rougher eastern section. The infrared spectrum of pure crystalline plagioclase has been identified on the east rim.

This depression was named after Alexander the Great (356 – 323 BC). Its designation was formally adopted by the International Astronomical Union in 1935. The name was introduced into lunar nomenclature by amateur selenographers William R. Birt and John Lee in the nineteenth century.

== Alexander during local sunrise ==
When the morning terminator runs at 17° east, a bright chiaroscuro effect is noticeable at 40° north / 13° east, on the western section of the rim of Alexander. This effect looks like a small version of the Jeweled Handle at Montes Jura, also appearing during local sunrise.

During full moon, the western region on the floor of Alexander looks dark. Small sections of Montes Caucasus, at the western part of Alexander's rim, appear bright. These bright sections are also seen on the photographic version of chart LAC 26 (page 52) in The Clementine Atlas of the Moon (Ben Bussey / Paul D. Spudis).

== Satellite craters ==
By convention these features are identified on lunar maps by placing the letter on the side of the crater midpoint that is closest to Alexander.

| Alexander | Latitude | Longitude | Diameter |
|---|---|---|---|
| A | 40.7° N | 14.9° E | 4 km |
| B | 40.3° N | 15.2° E | 4 km |
| C | 38.5° N | 14.9° E | 5 km |
| K | 40.5° N | 19.3° E | 4 km |
