= Calippus (crater) =

Crater on the Moon

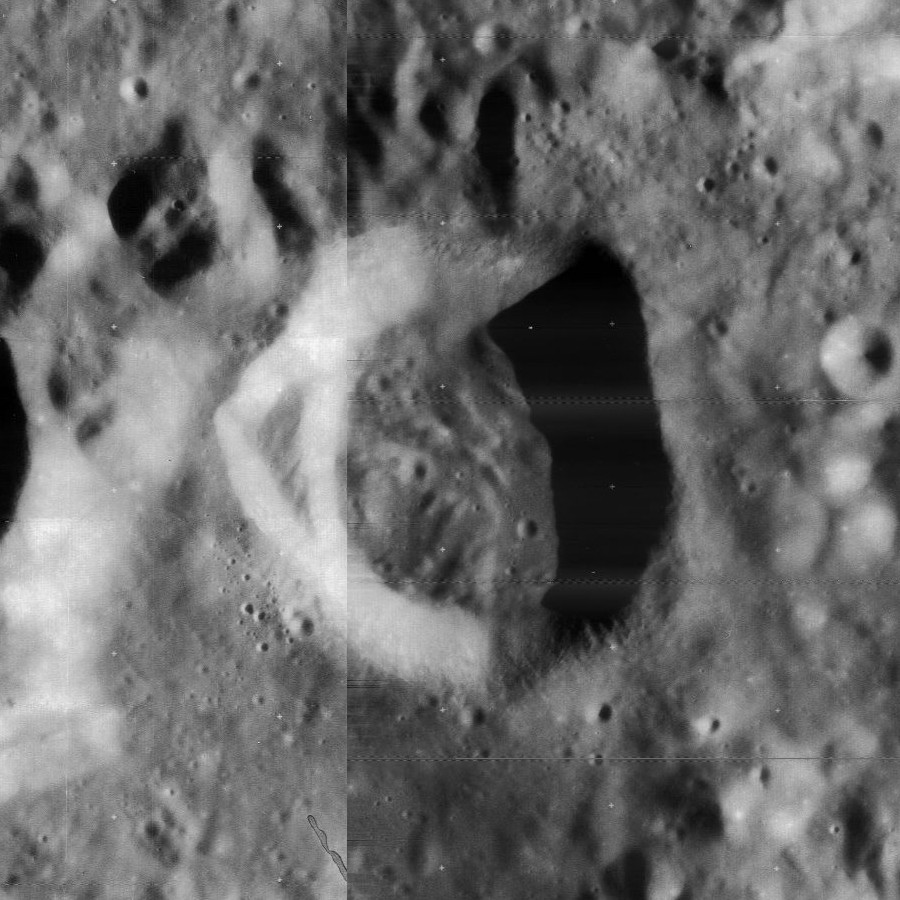
- Mosaic of Lunar Orbiter 4 images
- Coordinates: 38.9°N 10.7°E
- Diameter: 34.03 km (21.15 mi)
- Depth: 2.69 km (1.67 mi)
- Colongitude: 350° at sunrise
- Eponym: Callippus

Calippus is a small lunar impact crater that is located on the eastern edge of the rugged Montes Caucasus mountain range in the northern part of the Moon. It lies to the southwest of the crater remnant Alexander, to the northwest of the Mare Serenitatis.

The outer rim of Calippus has an irregular appearance, with outward bulges to the northeast and particularly to the west where there is an interior shelf resembling slumped material. This crater is large enough for slumping to occur, but the remainder of the inner wall is free of slumps. The rim along the north to east edges has an altitude of over 2 km.

The exterior has a slight rampart that is surrounded by the rugged terrain of the mountain range. Within the sharp-sided interior walls is a rough and irregular interior floor. This surface may have experienced extrusions. Two instances of lunar transient phenomenon have been reported for this crater.

To the southeast of this crater, on the edge of the Mare Serenitatis, is an arcing rille designated Rima Calippus. This cleft follows a path to the northeast for a length of about 40 kilometers. A pyroclastic deposit has been identified in this area based on its low strength radar signature.

This crater was named after Greek astronomer Callippus of Cyzicus (c. 370 B.C.). His name was incorporated into lunar nomenclature by Italian astronomer Giovanni B. Riccioli in 1651, but he assigned it to the crater now known as Alexander. The designation Callippus was adopted by the International Astronomical Union in 1935.

== Calippus during full moon ==
The inner slopes of Calippus look like a bright ring during full moon. A small section of Montes Caucasus near satellite crater Calippus C, immediately west of Calippus itself, also shows bright slopes. The brightness of Calippus and of the nearby small section of Montes Caucasus is also noticeable on the photographic versions of charts LAC 25 (page 50) and LAC 26 (page 52) in The Clementine Atlas of the Moon (Ben Bussey / Paul D. Spudis).

== Satellite craters ==
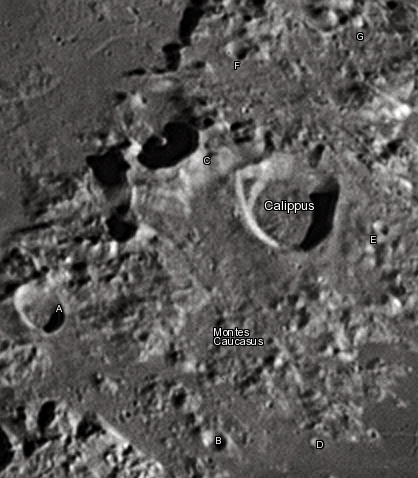
Calippus crater and its satellite craters

By convention these features are identified on lunar maps by placing the letter on the side of the crater midpoint that is closest to Calippus.

Calippus	Latitude	Longitude	Diameter
A	37.0° N	7.9° E	16 km
B	36.0° N	10.0° E	7 km
C	39.6° N	9.1° E	40 km
D	36.3° N	11.3° E	4 km
E	38.9° N	11.9° E	5 km
F	40.5° N	10.0° E	6 km
G	41.3° N	11.5° E	4 km

== Gallery ==
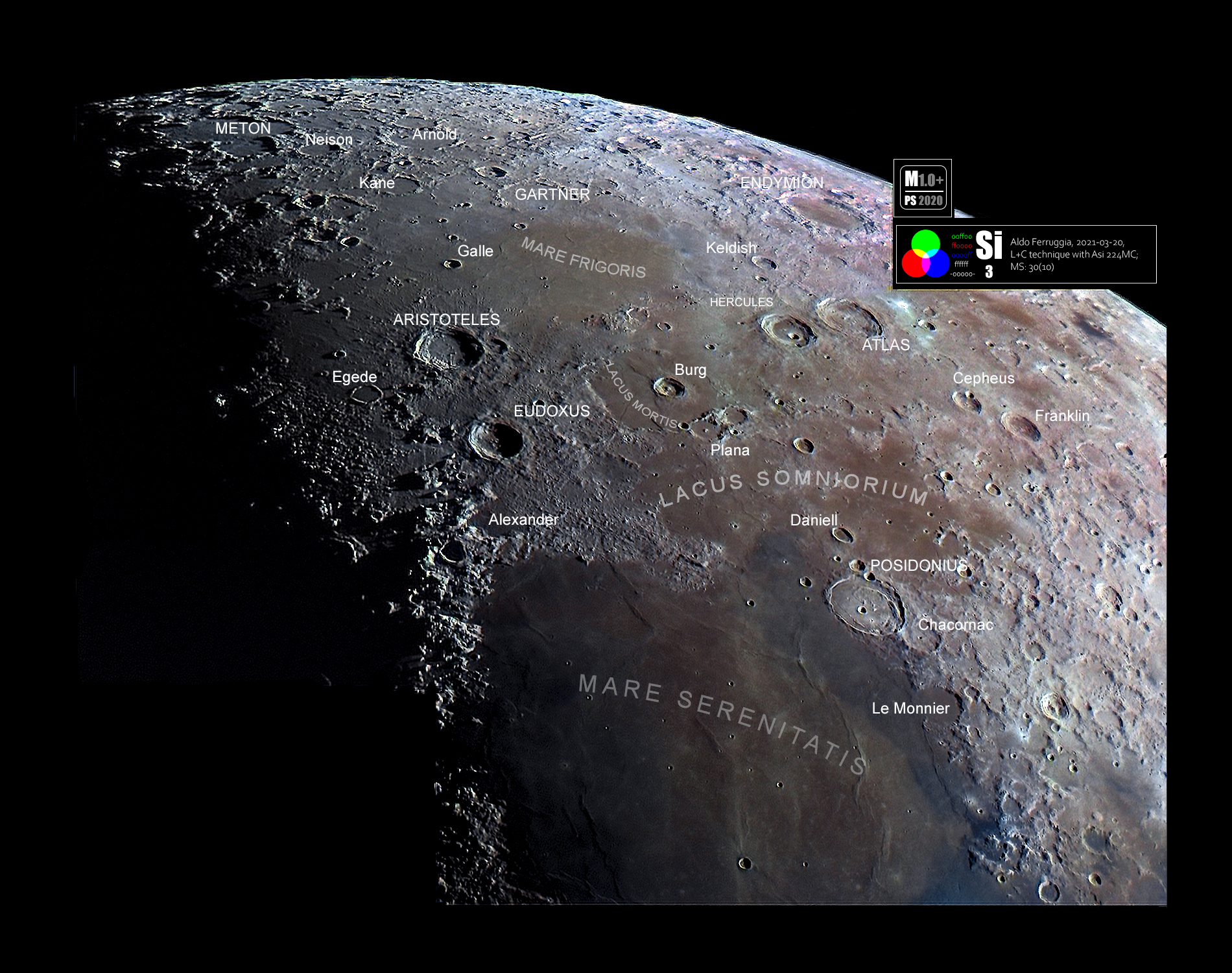
Calippus area with mineral postprocessing

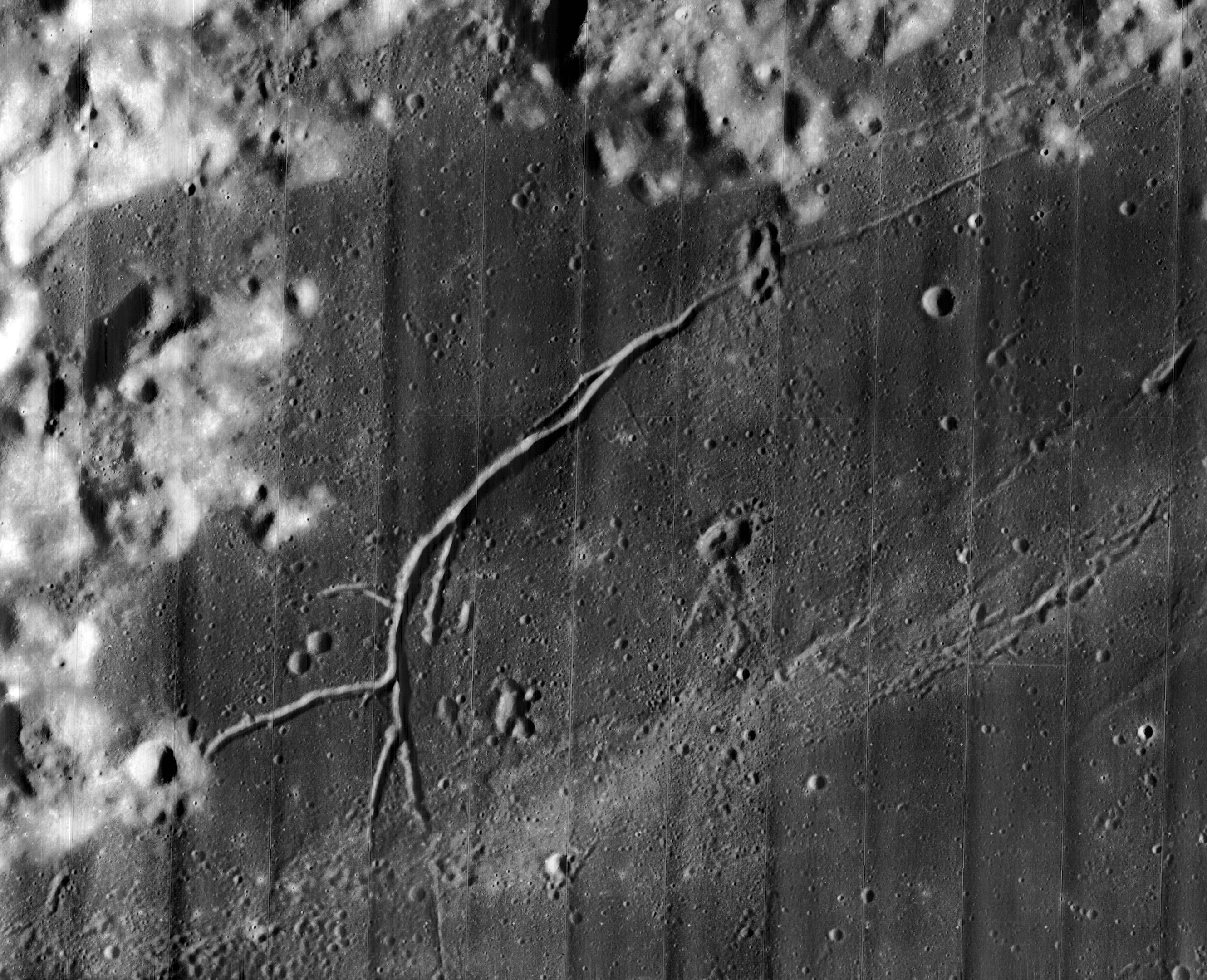
Lunar Orbiter 5 image of Rima Calippus

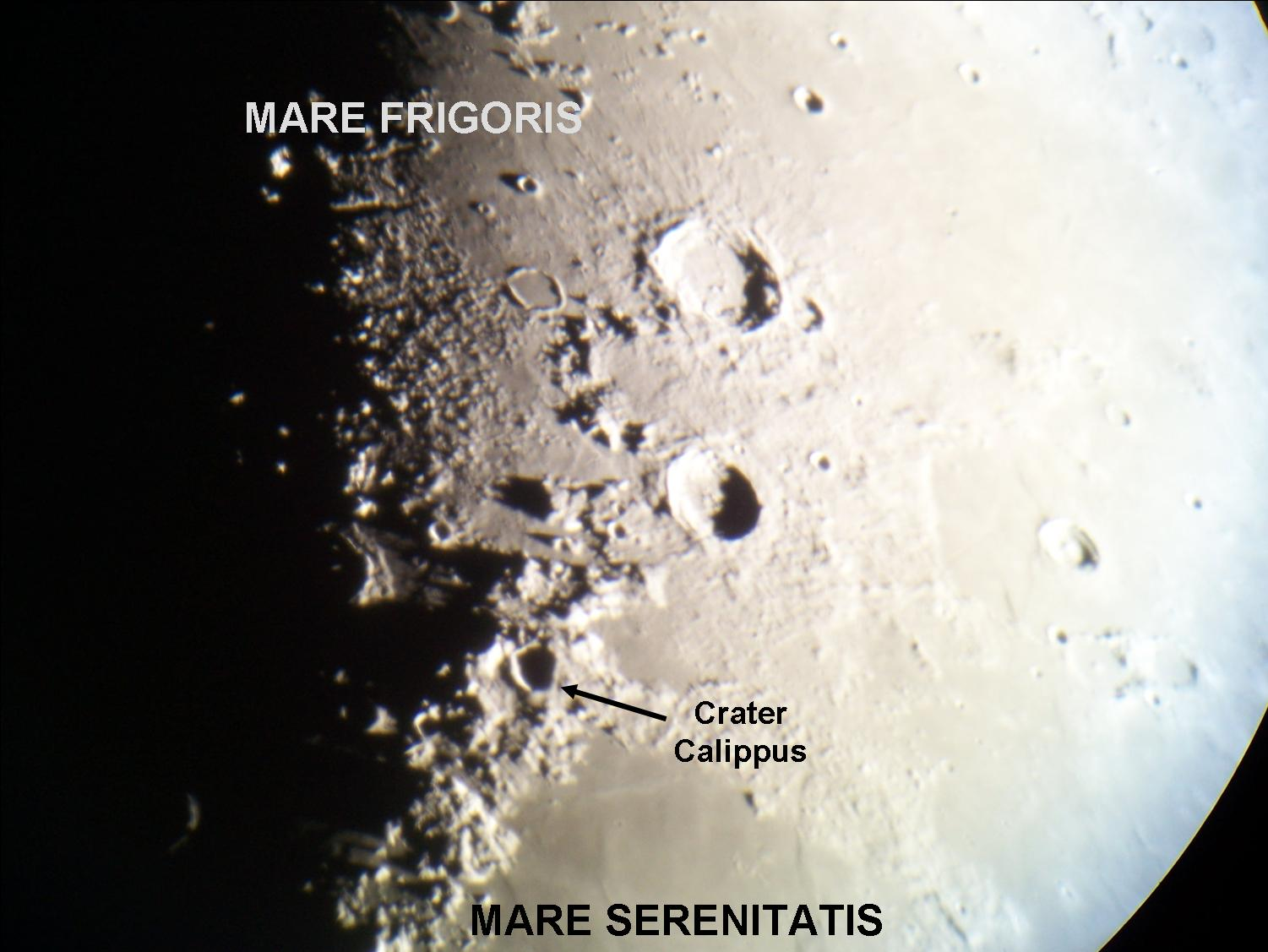
Location of Calippus
