= Steel square =

Flat tool used in carpentry to mark right angles and calculate angles

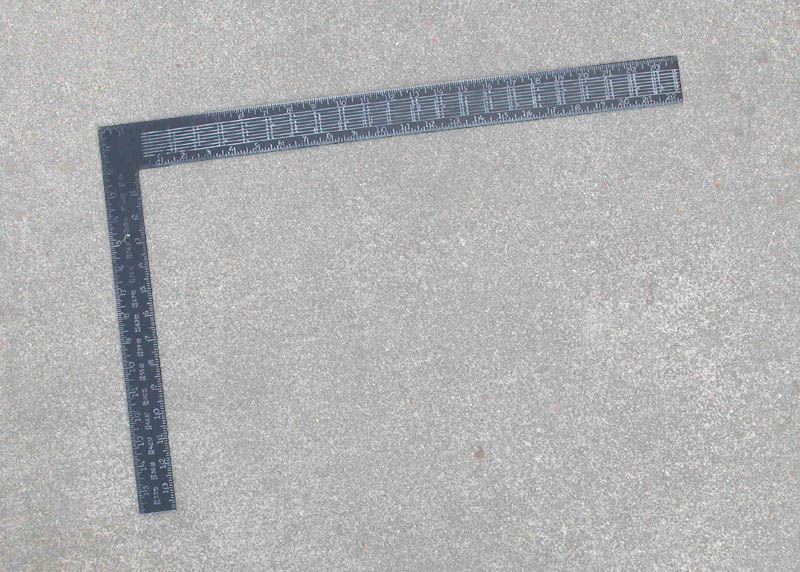
- Other names: Framing square; Carpenter's square
- Classification: Type of square; Carpentry hand tool
- Used with: Carpenter's pencil; Plumb bob

The steel square is a tool used in carpentry. Carpenters use various tools to lay out structures that are square (that is, built at accurately measured right angles), many of which are made of steel, but the name steel square refers to a specific long-armed square that has additional uses for measurement, especially of various angles. It consists of a long, wider arm and a shorter, narrower arm, which meet at an angle of 90 degrees (a right angle). Today the steel square is more commonly referred to as the framing square or carpenter's square, and such squares are no longer invariably made of steel (as they were many decades ago); they can also be made of aluminum or polymers, which are light and resistant to rust.

The longer wider arm is 50 millimetres (2.0 in) wide, and is called the body; the shorter narrower arm, is 37 millimetres (1.5 in) wide, and is called the tongue. The square has many uses, including laying out common rafters, hip rafters and stairs. It has a diagonal scale, board foot scale and an octagonal scale. On the newer framing squares there are degree conversions for different slopes and fractional equivalents.

Framing squares may also be used as winding sticks.

== Body and tongue ==
In traditional timber frame joinery, mortises and tenons were typically 50 millimetres (2.0 in) wide and 50 millimetres (2.0 in) from the edge of the timber when working with softwoods, giving rise to the width of the body. Likewise, mortises and tenons were traditionally 37 millimetres (1.5 in) wide when working in hardwoods, explaining the width of the tongue. This allowed for quick layouts of mortise and tenon joints when working both hard and softwoods.

== Use ==
=== Calibration ===
A steel square is self-proving and self-calibrating in that you can lay out a perpendicular line, flip the square over, and determine the size and direction of the error. The error can be corrected by opening or closing the angle with a center punch.

=== Stair framing ===
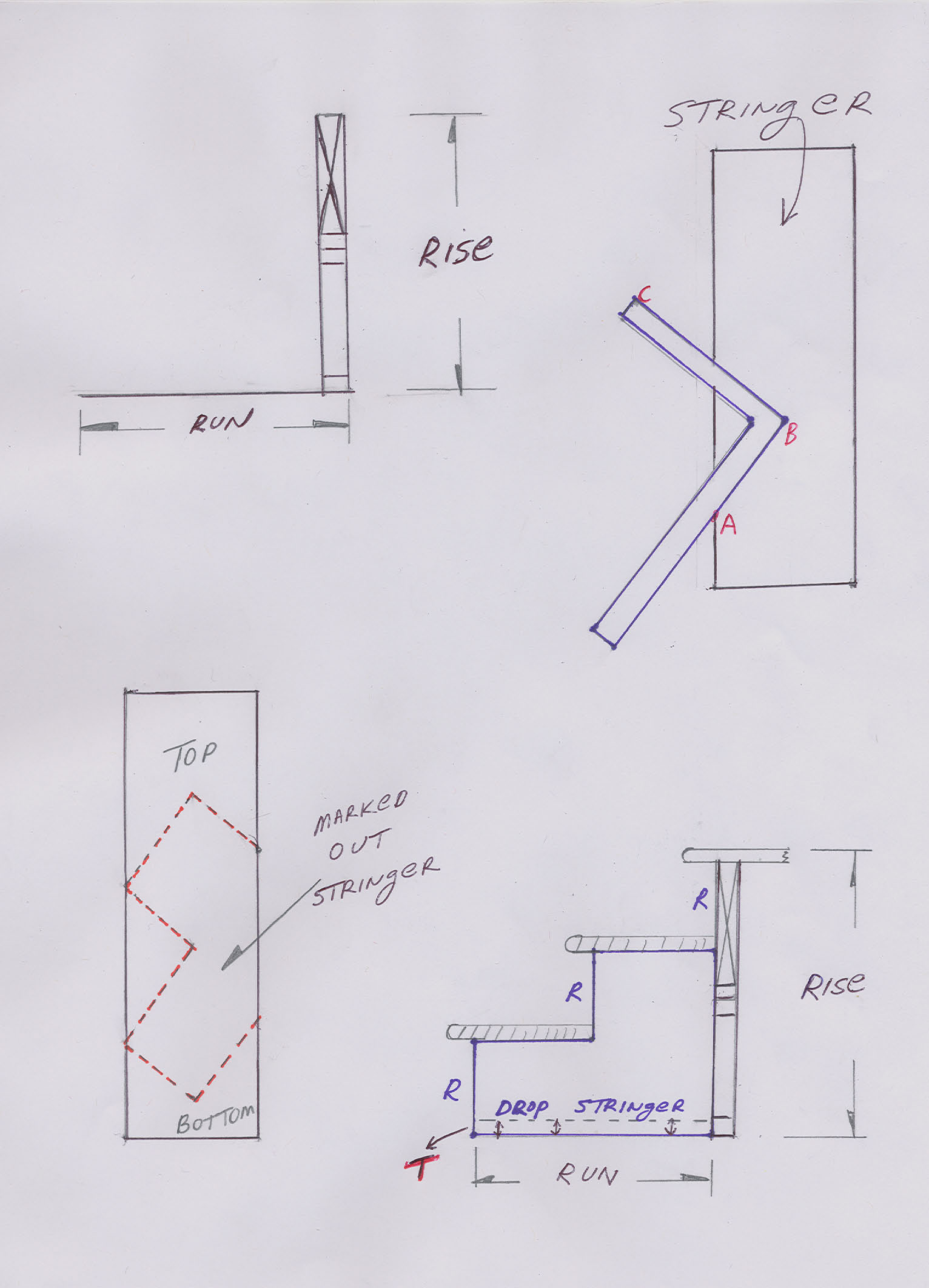
Theoretical rise and run of stringer, placement of square, marking of tread and rise, dropping the stringer, ABC=90°, total rise of stringer = 2R-T, total run of stringer = 2AB.

Stairs usually consist of three components. They are the stringer, the tread and the riser. The stringer is the structural member that carries the load of the staircase, the tread is the horizontal part that is stepped on, and the riser board is the vertical part which runs the width of the structure. There are many types of stairs: open, closed, fully housed, winding, and so on, to mention a few of them.

Laying out a staircase requires rudimentary math. There are numerous building codes to which staircases must conform. In an open area the designer can incorporate a more desirable staircase. In a confined area this becomes more challenging. In most staircases there is one more rise than there are treads.

1. The rise (vertical measurement), and the run (horizontal measurement). The stringer will rest partially on the horizontal surface.
2. This is a two-by-twelve piece of lumber. A framing square is placed on the lumber so that the desired rise and tread marks meet the edge of the board. The outline of the square is traced. The square is slid up the board until the tread is placed on the mark and the process is repeated.
3. The board is cut along the dotted lines, and the top plumb cut and the bottom level cut are traced by holding the square on the opposite side.
4. The stringer in this example has two pieces of tread stock. This allows for a slight overhang. There is also a space in between the boards. The bottom of the stringer must be cut to the thickness of the tread. This step is called dropping the stringer. After one stringer is cut this piece becomes the pattern that is traced onto the remaining stringers.

=== Roof framing ===
Blade of steel square
	18"	17"	16"	15"	14"	13"	12"	10"	9"	8"
Common rafter length per foot run	21.63"			19.21"			16.97"			14.42"
Hip or valley rafter length per foot run	24.74"			22.65"			20.78"			18.76"
Difference in length of jacks 16 inch centers	28.88"			25.63"			22.63"			19.25"
Difference in length of jacks 24 inch centers	43.25"			38.44"			33.94"			28.88"
Side cut length of jack rafters	6.69"			7.5"			8.5"			10.00"
Side cut of hip rafter or valley rafter	8.25"			9.0"			9.81"			10.88"
This table shows five different types of rafter calculations and one table for marking an angle called the side cut or cheek cut.

There is a table of numbers on the face side of the steel square; this is called the rafter table. The rafter table allows the carpenter to make quick calculations based on the Pythagorean theorem. The table is organized by columns that correspond to various slopes of the roof. Each column describes a different roof inclination (slope) and contains the following information:

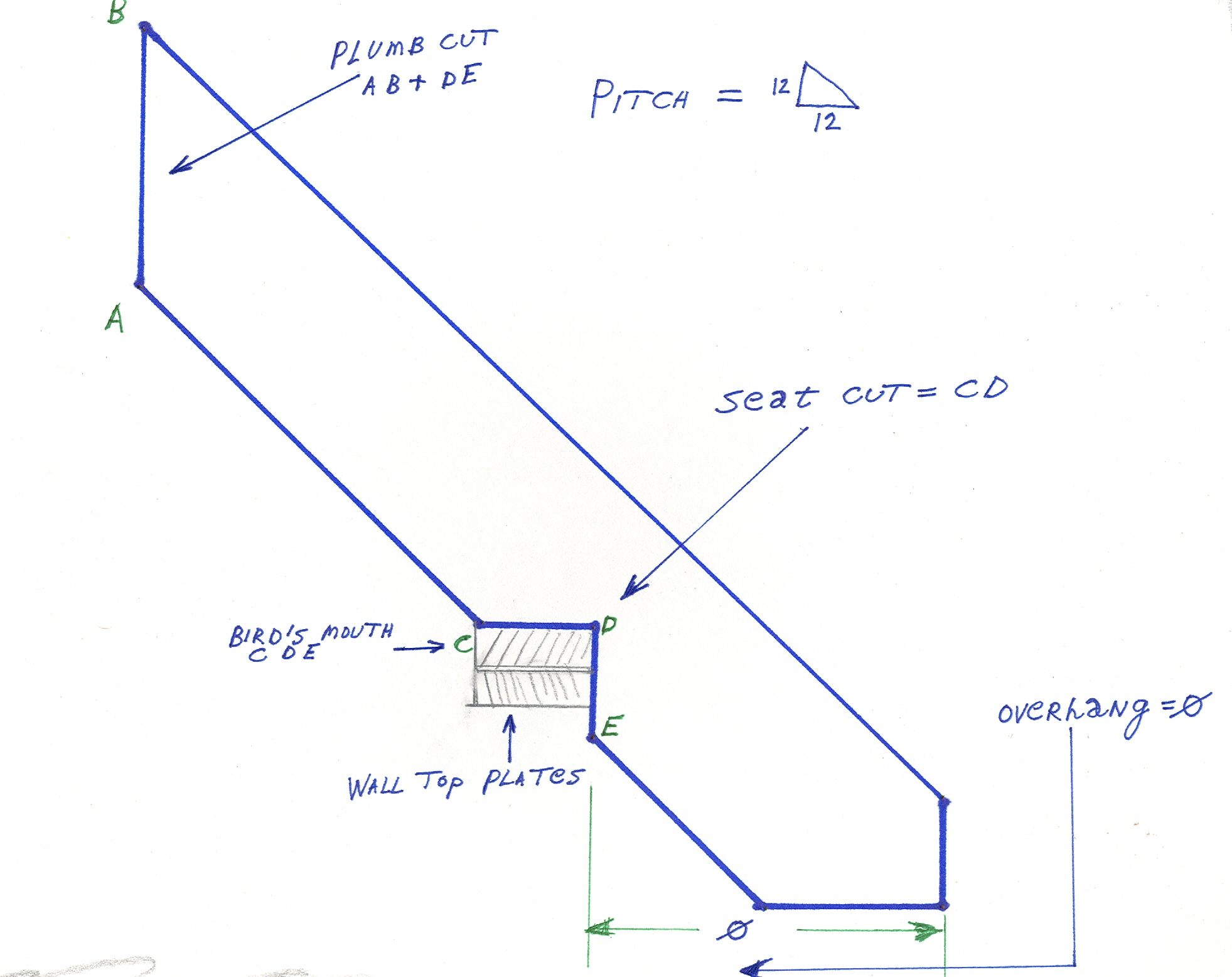
This is a common rafter with the two different cuts. The plumb cut fits in the ridge board and the Bird's mouth fits on the wall plate.

1. Common rafter per foot of run. The common rafter connects the peak of a roof (the ridge) to the base of a roof (the plate). This number gives the unit line length (hypotenuse) of the common rafter per twelve inches of horizontal distance (run).
2. Hip or valley rafter per foot of run. The hip or valley rafter also connects the ridge to the plate, but lies at a 45-degree angle to the common rafter. This number gives the length of the hip or valley rafter per twelve inches of run.
3. Difference in lengths jacks. The jack rafters lie in the same plane as the common rafter but connect the top plate (the wall) or ridge board to the hip or valley rafter respectively. Since the hip or valley rafter meets the ridge board and the common rafter at angles of 45 degrees, the jack rafters will have varying lengths when they intersect the hip or valley. Depending on the spacing of the rafters, their lengths will vary by a constant factor—this number is the common difference.
4. This angle can be cut on the fly by aligning this given number on the body of the steel square and the twelve-inch mark on the tongue, and drawing a line along the tongue.
5. Cutting hip and valley cripple rafters are all cut in a similar way.
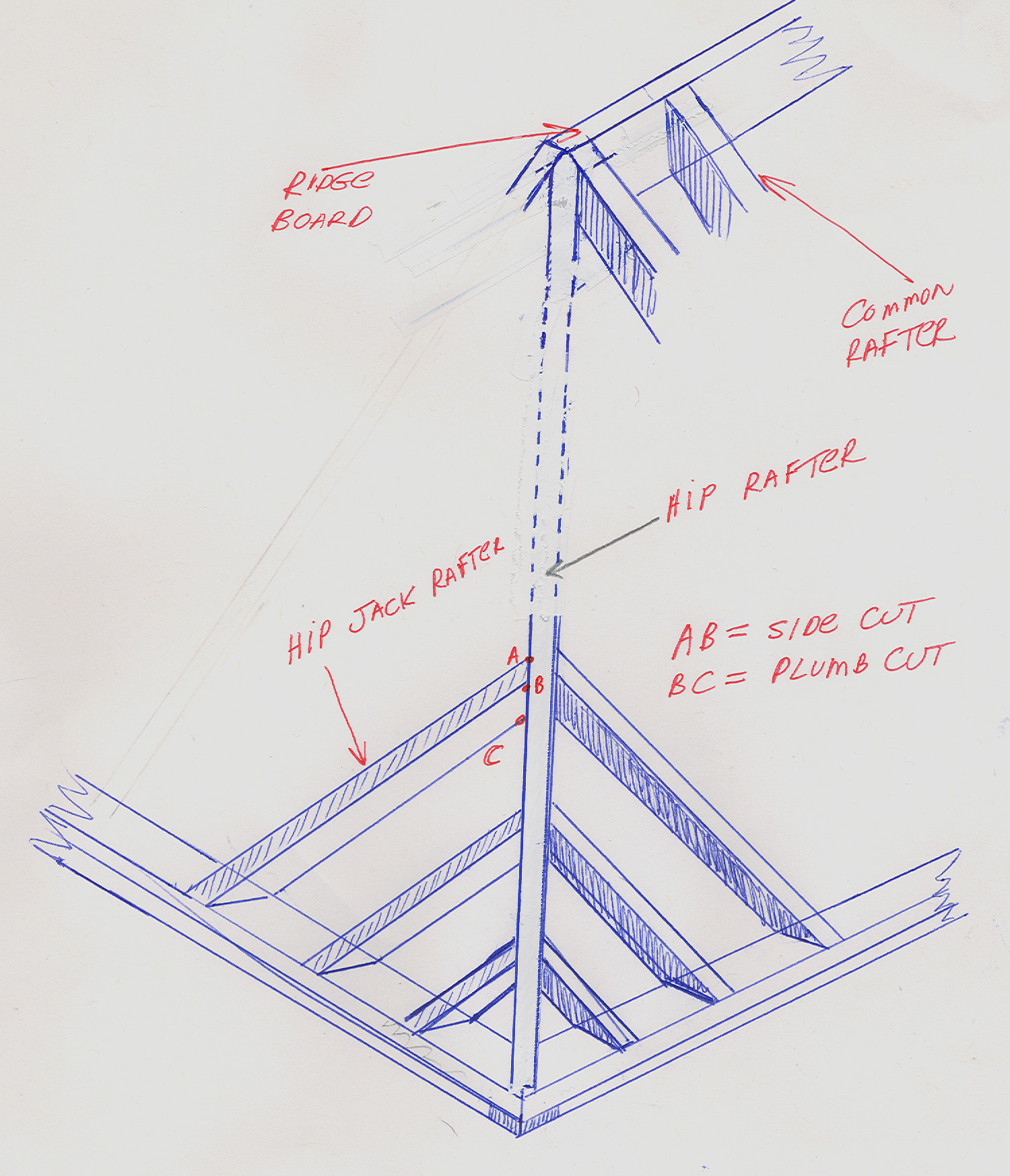
The relationship between hip, jack and common rafters, and how they tie into the ridge and bottom plate. The rafters are fastened to the horizontal ridge board at the peak of the roof.

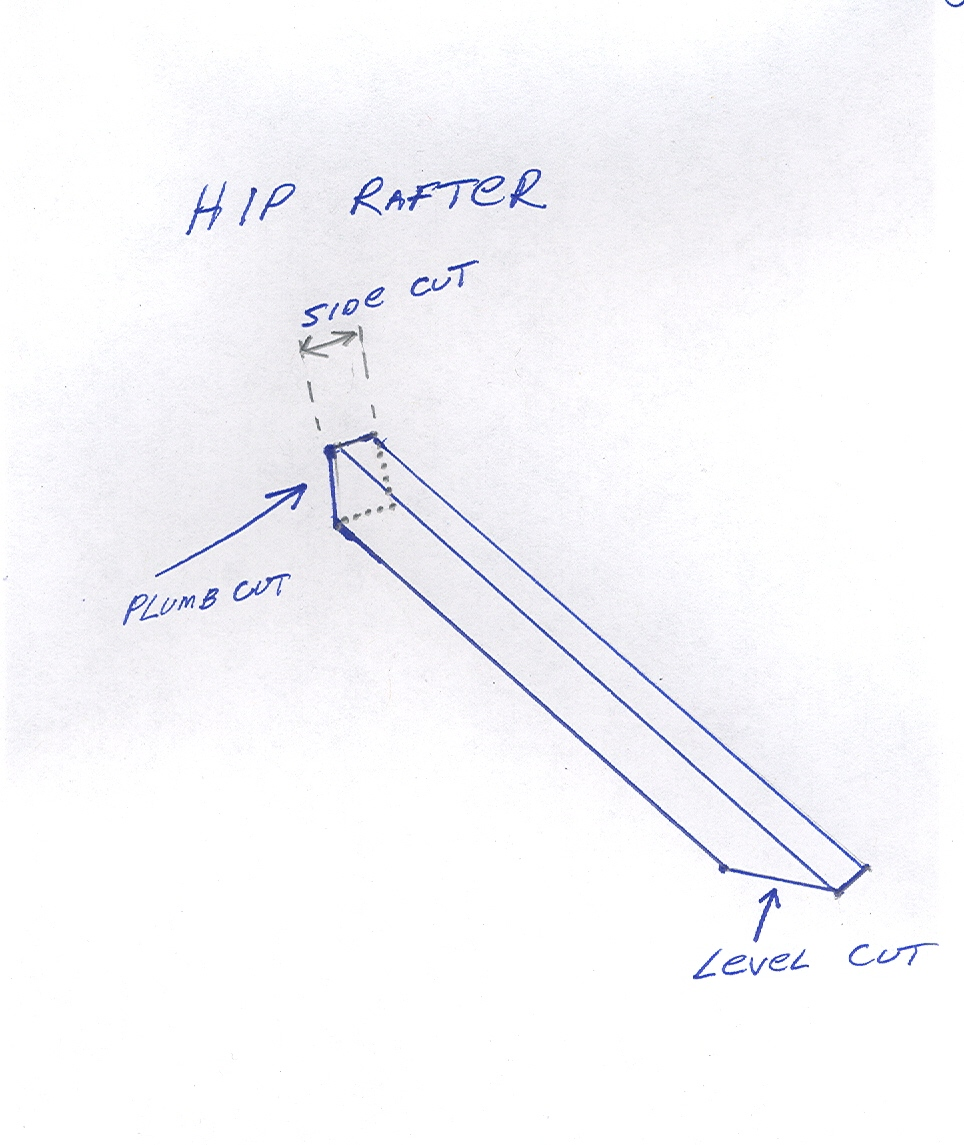
The side cut is the beveled angle of the hip or valley rafter that fits into the ridge board in this image.

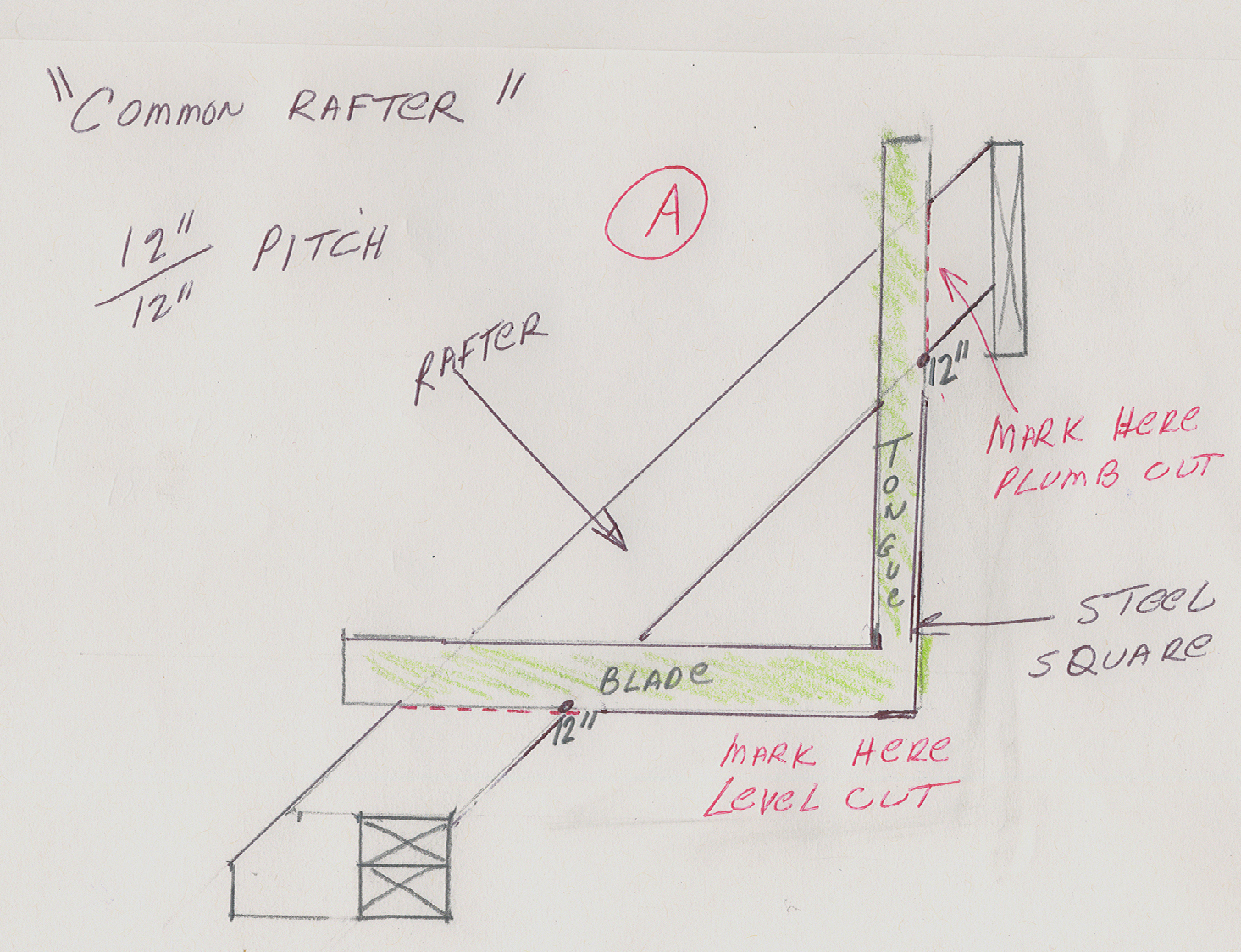
Common and jack rafters all use twelve as the common reference to mark the plumb cut.

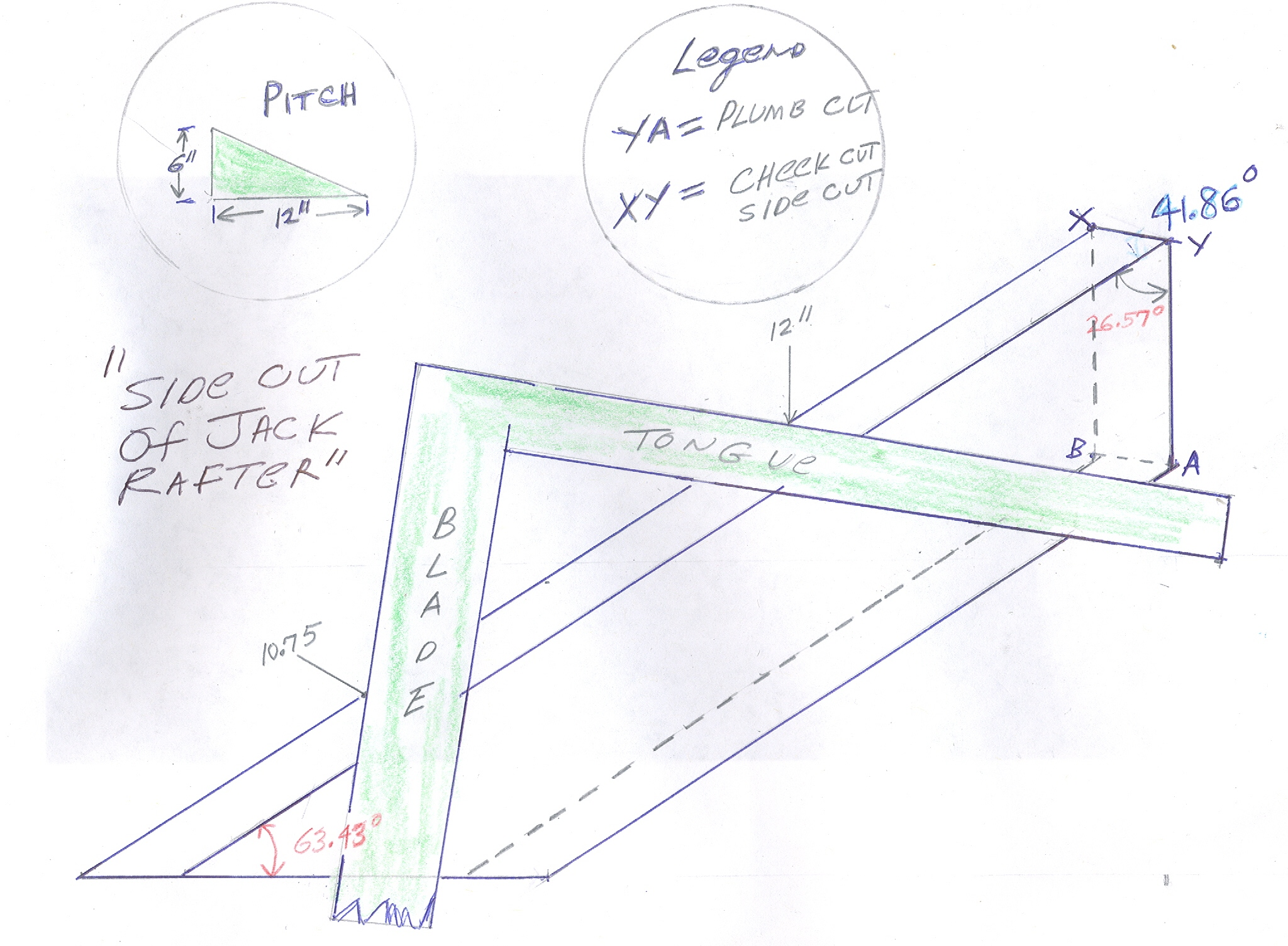
Hip and jack rafters use twelve as a common reference while aligning the desired pitch in the side cut column.

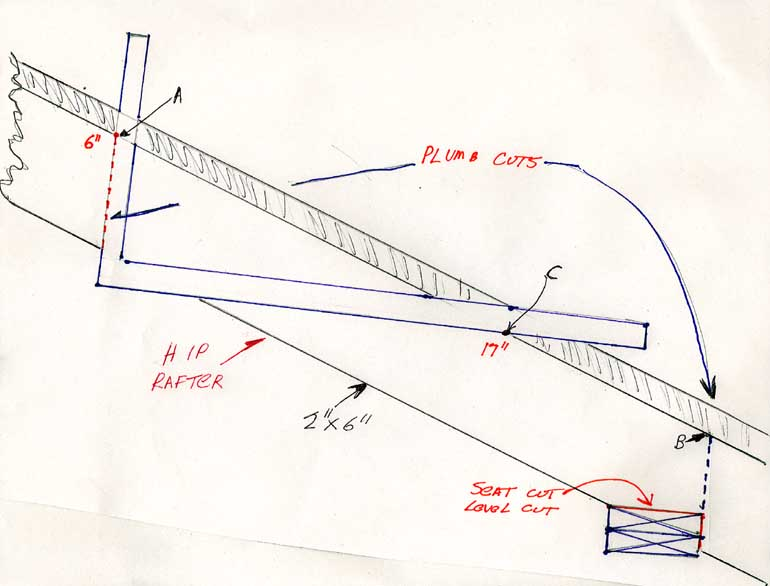
Hip and valley rafters use seventeen as the common reference for marking the plumb cut of a rafter.

=== Octagon scale ===
The octagon scale allows the user to inscribe an octagon inside a square, given the length of the side of the square. The markings indicate half the length of the octagon's sides, which can be set to a compass or divider. Arcs drawn from the midpoints of the square's sides will intersect the square at the vertices of the planned octagon. All that remains is to cut four triangular sections from the square.

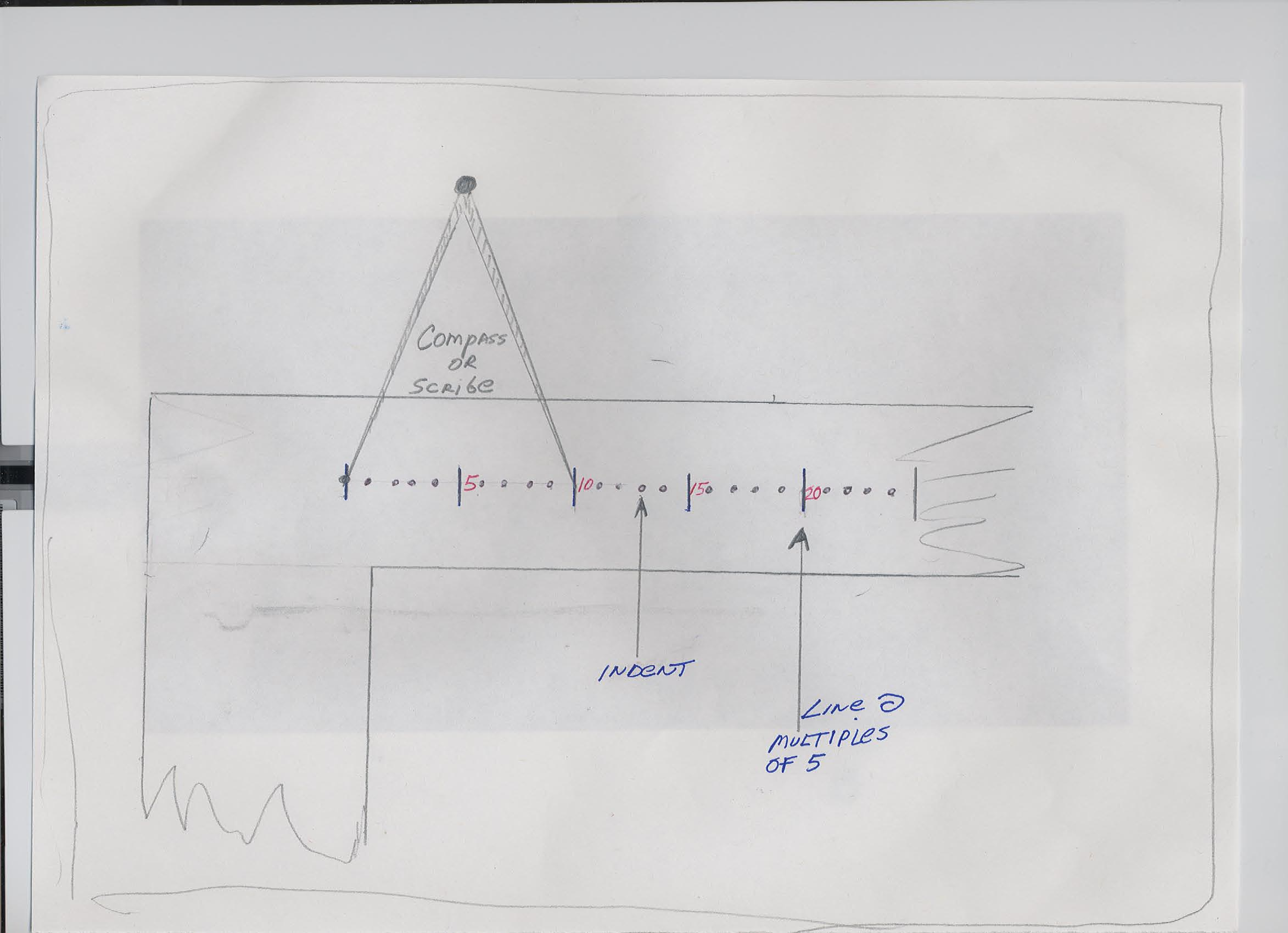
Octagon table located on the front side of the steel square.

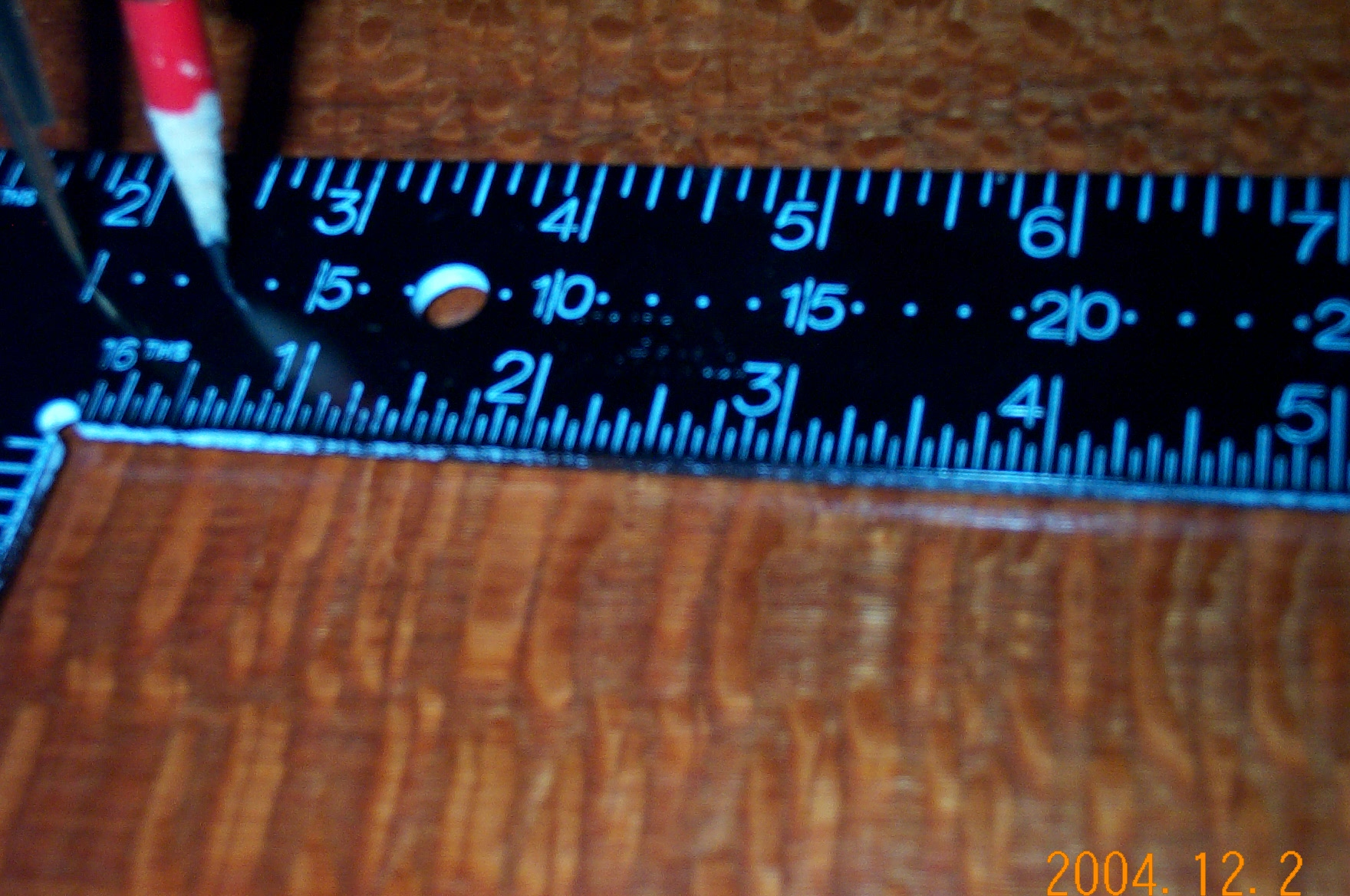
Octagon table viewed from an aluminum square.

4 steps to draw Octagons.

=== Diagonal scale ===
Knee bracing is a common feature in timber framing to prevent racking under lateral loads. The diagonal scale is useful for determining the length of the a knee brace desired for a given distance from the joint between the post and beam.

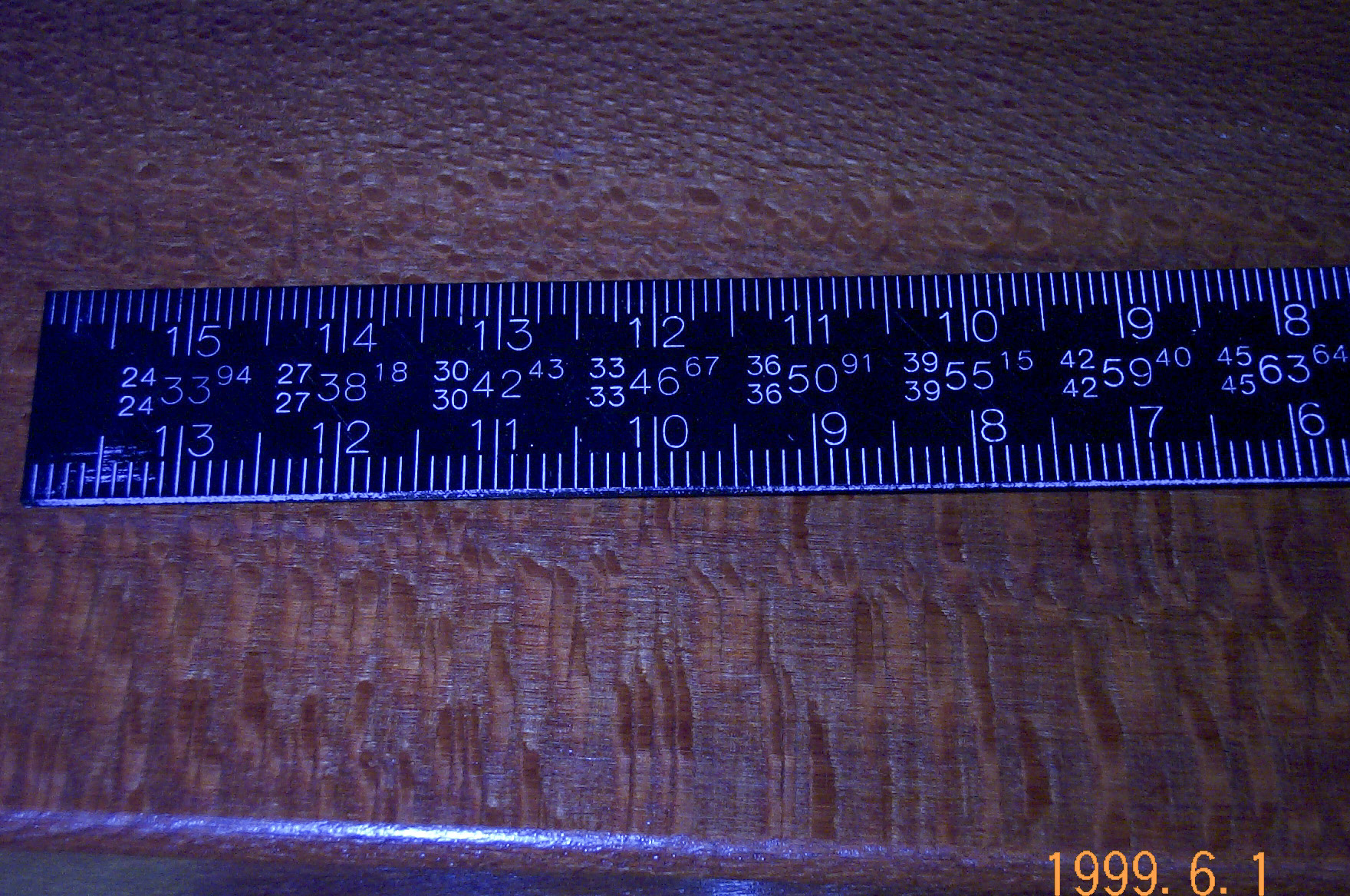
This is the location of the diagonal scale on the square.

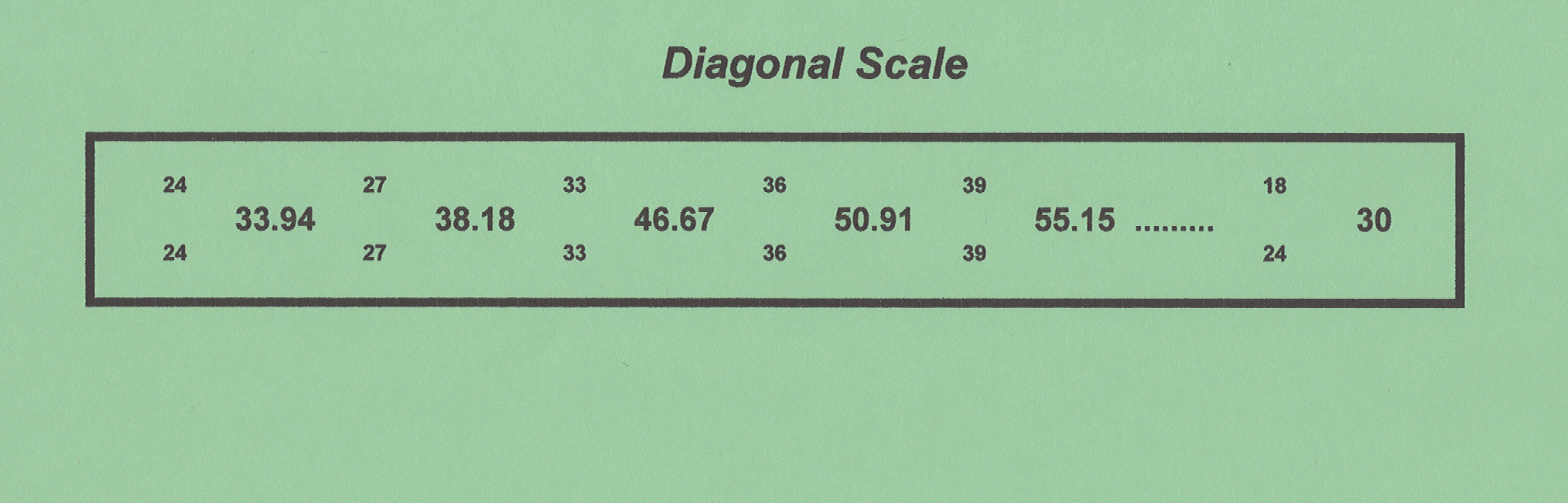
The diagonal scale gives the diagonal, or the hypotenuse, for the different legs of the triangle for which a brace is to be cut.

=== Calculators in roof framing ===
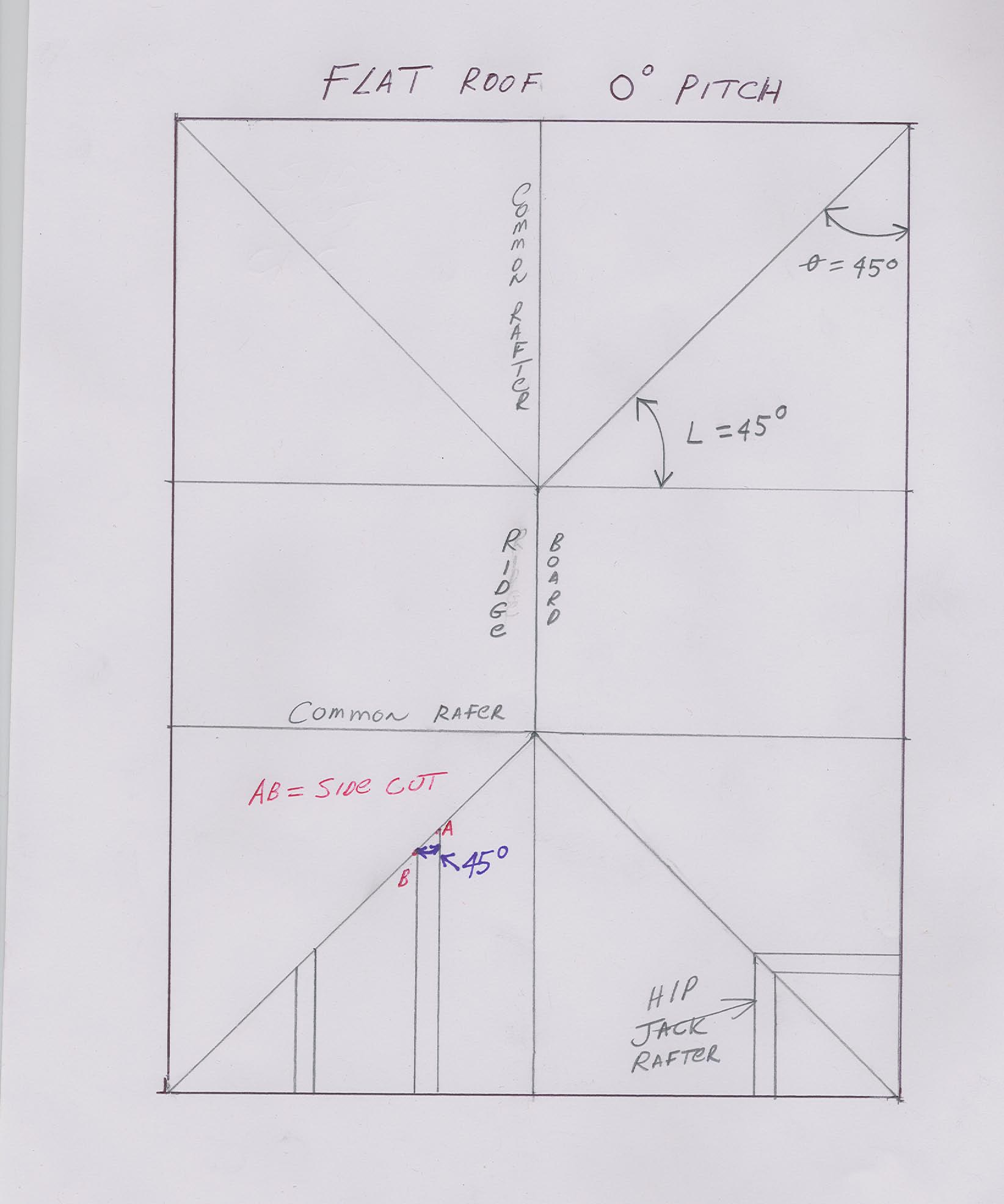

In addition to use the square tool, construction calculators are also used to verify and determine roofing calculations. Some are programmed to calculate all side cuts for hip, valley and jack regular rafters to be exactly 45° for all rafter pitches. The rafter table is expressed in inches, and the higher the numerical value of the slope, the greater the difference between side cut angles within a given slope. Only a level roof, or a 0 slope will require a 45° angle side cut (cheek cut) for hip and jack rafters.

=== Side cut hip/valley rafter table ===
If a right triangle has two angles that equal 45° then the two sides are equidistant. The rafter is the hypotenuse and the legs or catheti of the triangle are the top wall plates of the structure. The side cut is located at the intersection of the given slope column and the side cut of the hip/valley row. The regular hip/valley rafter runs at a 45° angle to the common rafter and the unit of measurement is 12 inches of run. Regular hip/valley and jack rafters have different bevel angles within any given slope and the angle decreases as the slope increases.

$c = \sqrt{12^2 + 12^2} \,$	$L= \sqrt{c^2 + P^2} \,$	$tangent = \frac{c}{L}\,$
Legend
c = hypotenuse; P = pitch; L = rafter length; Z = difference in L of jack rafter 16" OC

The side cut of the hip/valley rafter = (Tangent)(12) = side cut in inches. The side cuts in the rafter table are all in a base 12. The arc tan can be determined from any given slope. Most power tools and angle measuring devices use 90° as 0° in construction. The complementary angles of the arc tan are used with tools like the speed square.

=== Side cut of jack rafters ===
The side cut is located at the intersection of the side cut of jack rafters row and the slope column on the Steel square. There is a row for the difference in length of jacks, 16 and 24 inch centers on the body. The tangents are directly proportional for both centers.

$tangent = \frac{16}{z} \,$

The tangent is in a base 12. The tangent x 12 = side cut of jack rafters. This corresponds to the side cut on the Steel square. The complementary angles of the arc tan are used on most angle measuring devices in construction. The tangent of hip, valley, and jack rafters are less than 1.00 in all pitches above 0°. An eighteen to twelve slope has a side cut angle of 29.07° and a two to twelve slope has a side cut angle of 44.56° for jack rafters. This is a variation of 15.5° between slopes.

Side cut angles versus slope

This is a reference table for side cuts versus slope. (only valid for 90 degrees eave angle) :

Slope expressed in inches

Slope 18/12 ==> 60,86 deg

Slope 17/12 ==> 60,10 deg

Slope 16/12 ==> 59,07 deg

Slope 15/12 ==> 57,99 deg

Slope 14/12 ==> 56,94 deg

Slope 13/12 ==> 55,88 deg

Slope 12/12 ==> 54,69 deg

Slope 11/12 ==> 53,49 deg

Slope 10/12 ==> 52,54 deg

Slope 9/12 ==> 51,25 deg

Slope 8/12 ==> 50,19 deg

Slope 7/12 ==> 49,17 deg

Slope 6/12 ==> 48,15 deg

Slope 5/12 ==> 47,33 deg

Slope 4/12 ==> 46,54 deg

Slope 3/12 ==> 45,90 deg

Slope 2/12 ==> 45,22 deg

Slope 1/12 ==> 45,10 deg

Slope 0/12 ==> 45,00 deg

=== Plumb cut of jack and common rafters ===
The plumb cut for jack and common rafters are the same angles. The level cut or seat cut is the complementary angle of the plumb cut. The notch formed at the intersection of the level and plumb cut Is commonly referred to as the bird's mouth .

$tangent = \frac{P}{b}.\,$

=== Plumb cut of hip/valley rafters ===
The plumb cut of the hip/valley rafter is expressed in the formula. The level cut is the complementary angle or 90° minus the arc tan.

$tangent = \frac{P}{\sqrt{a^2 + b^2}}. \,$

=== Irregular hip/valley rafters ===
The only Framing Square that has tables for unequal pitched roofs is the Chappell Universal Square, (patent #7,958,645). There is also a comprehensive rafter table for 6 & 8 sided polygon roofs (first time ever on a framing square). The traditional steel square's rafter table (patented April 23,1901) is limited in that it does not have tables that allow for work with unequal pitched roofs. Irregular hip/valley rafters are characterized by plan angles that are not equal or 45°. The top plates can be 90° at the outside corners or various other angles. There are numerous irregular h/v roof plans.

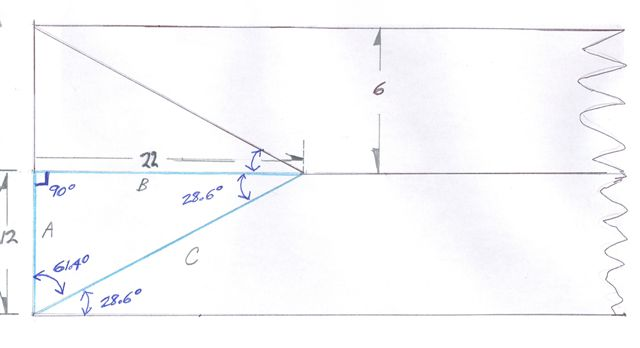
irregular hip/valley gable roof plan.

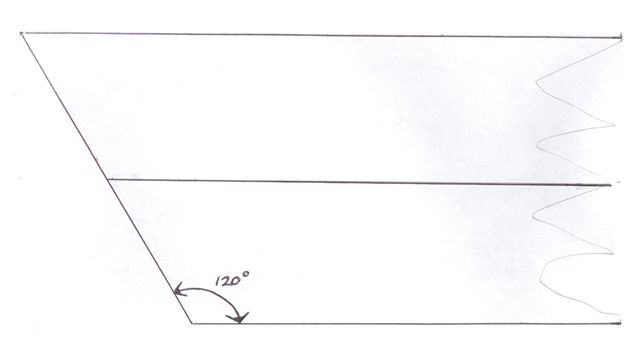
irregular roof plan.

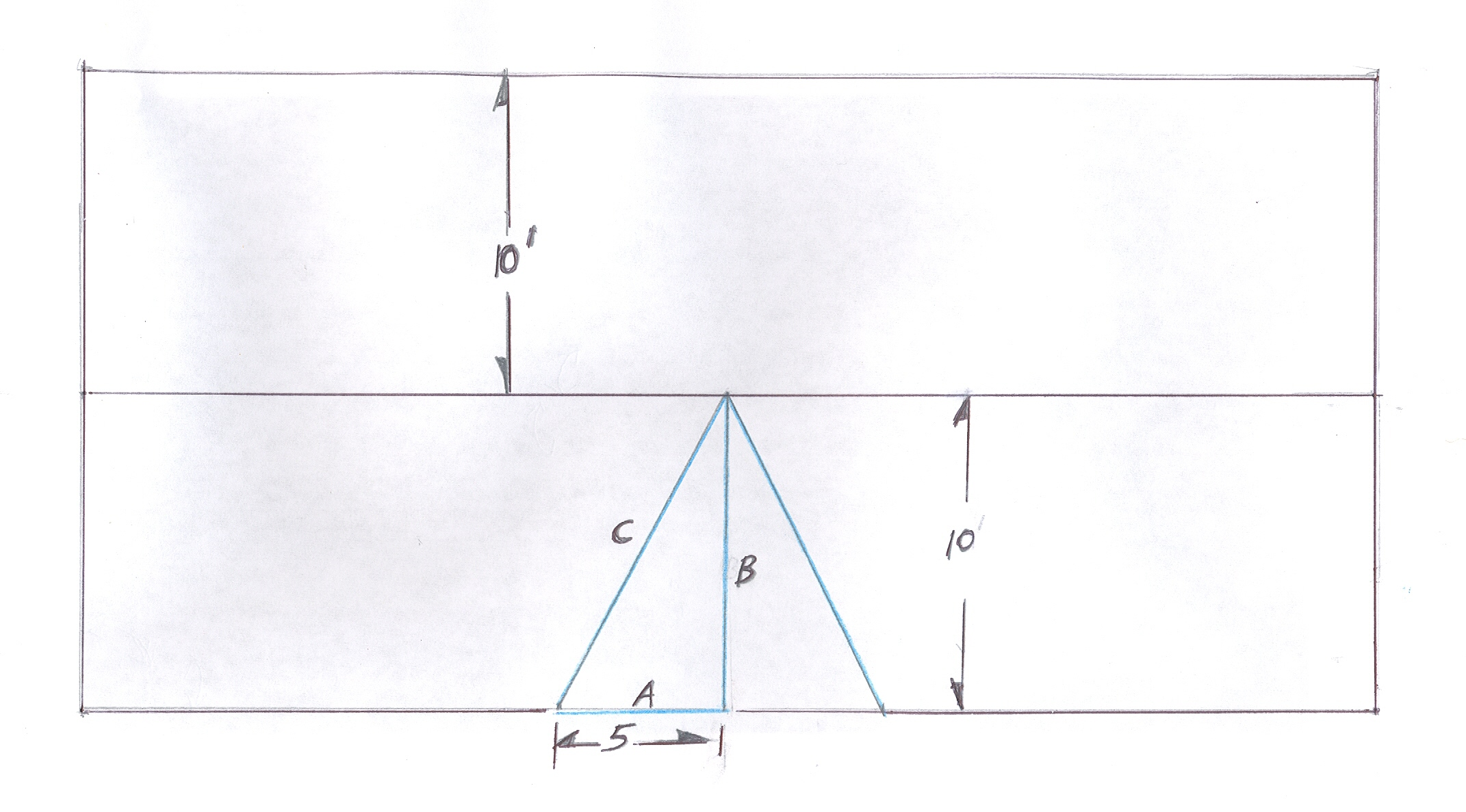
Intersecting irregular hip/valley gable roof plan.

== Carpenter's square ==
In carpentry, a square is a guide for establishing right angles (90° angles) or mitre angles, usually made of metal. There are various types of square, such as speed squares, try squares and combination squares.

== See also ==
- Trammel
- Punch
- Combination square
- Hip roof
- Set Square
