= Slab (sawmilling) =

Outer piece cut from a log when it is squared or sawn into boards

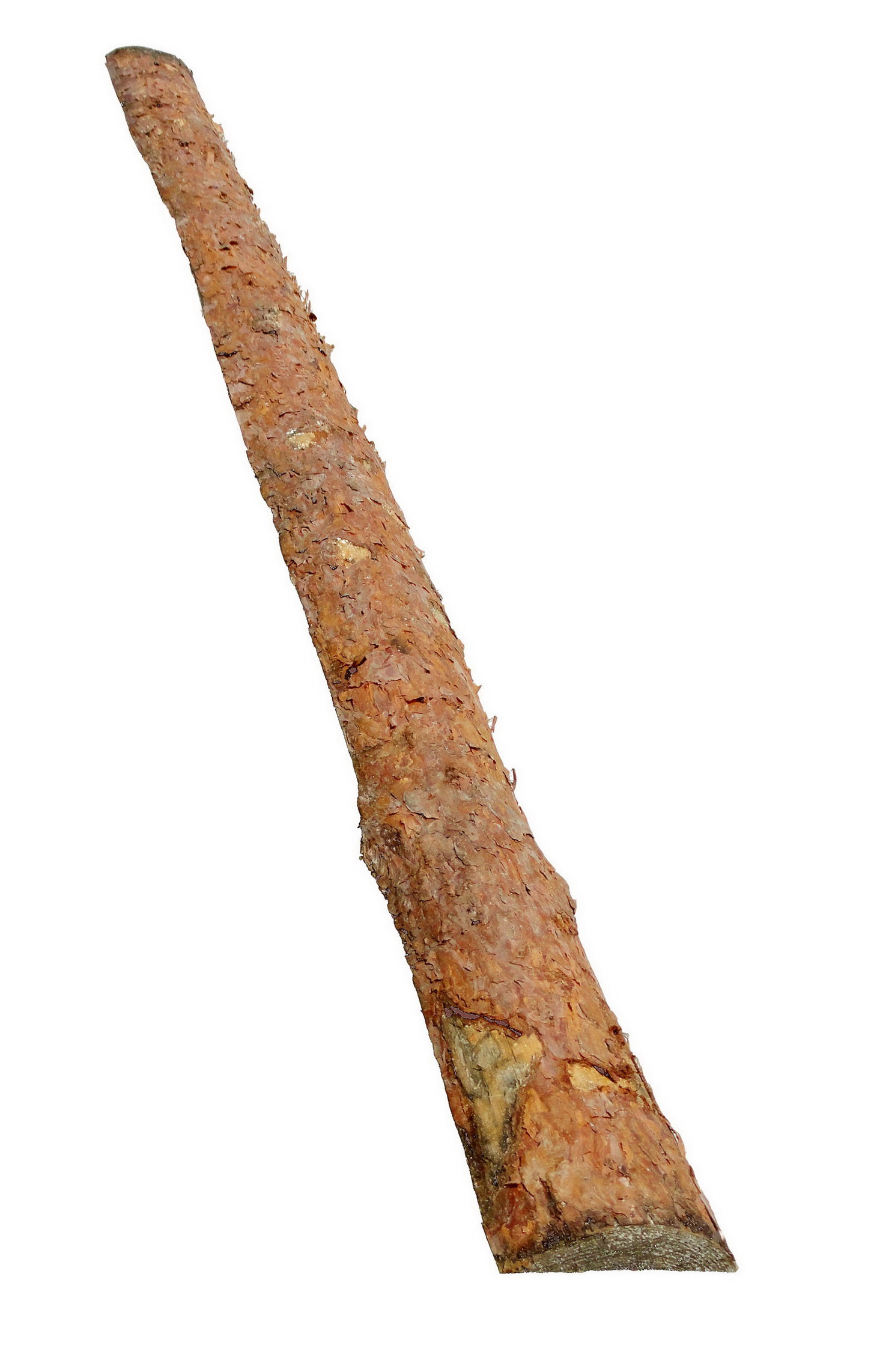
A slab, seen from its bark side

In sawmilling, a slab is the outer piece cut from a log when the log is squared or sawn into boards. It has one flat, sawn face. The rest of its surface is the rounded outside of the log, with or without bark. The slabs are the first and last boards cut from a log. Taken together they are called slabwood. Slabs were usually left as waste and burned, but a thick slab could yield a rough board.

== Terminology ==
English dictionaries define the slab as the outside piece cut from a log in squaring it, or as any of the outer parts of a log sawn off while the log is made into planks. The verb to slab means to cut these pieces from a log so that it can be squared, or sawn into boards with square edges. In Australia, slab also meant a piece of timber two or three inches thick, hewn with the axe rather than sawn, used for the walls of rough houses, and in Australian and New Zealand English a slab building is one made of such coarse planks. This is the sense of slab hut.

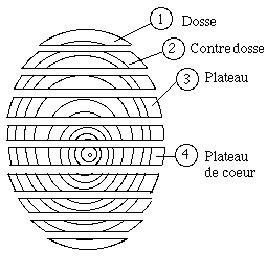
Sawing a log through and through, with the French names of the pieces: 1, slab (dosse); 2, contre-dosse; 3, plank (plateau); 4, heart plank (plateau de cœur)

The French term is dosse. The Grand dictionnaire terminologique of the Office québécois de la langue française defines it as any outer part of a log that the saw removes when the log is ripped lengthwise: a piece with one flat face, while the other side keeps the rounded surface of the log, with or without bark. In Quebec French, and sometimes in France, the spoken word is croûte ("crust"). Taking the slab off a log is called découvrir la grume or blanchir la grume ("uncovering" or "whitening the log"), and the flat face so made is a découvert. In his 1814 vocabulary of carpentry, the architect J. M. R. Morisot defined dosses as the pieces taken off with the saw to bring a timber to sharp edges (vive arête) and to an even size, and the verb dédosser as dressing a timber with the saw to sharp edges by cutting away the parts that still show wane. In the same vocabulary, dosse also meant a thick plank used as lagging on the centring of a vault, to hold back earth in a trench, or as a sheet pile in a cofferdam. The board sawn next after the slab is the contre-dosse. Morisot's vocabulary of joinery describes the slab itself, a waney plank from the first cuts on the trunk, as "good for little", and the contre-dosses as of better use. The architect Jean-Baptiste Rondelet explained the two terms in his treatise on building. The slabs are the first cuts made on the trunk, after the bark has been removed, to square it. When the trunk is so large that the slabs would be too thick, a second cut is made, and the piece between the bark and the sound wood is the contredosse. In fine timber the contredosses, lying close to the outside of the tree, are very soft; they have sapwood only at their ends, whereas the slabs have it over their whole rounded side. Neither, Rondelet wrote, can be used for the panels of joinery.

Slabwood, bois de dosse in French, should not be confused with boards sawn "on the slab" (débités sur dosse). These are flat-sawn boards whose growth rings meet the face at an angle of less than 45°.

== Squaring ==
Squaring (French: équarrissage) turns a round log into a timber of square section. Four segments are removed along the whole length of the log, leaving four faces at right angles to one another. These segments are the slabs. The naval officer Léopold Garraud, writing in 1863, defined the slab as the part that has to be removed from round timber to square it to sharp edges.

In nineteenth-century France, squaring was done either with the axe or with the saw. Woodcutters and hewers used the axe; sawyers used the saw. According to the carpentry manual of Biston and Hanus (1861), sawing was slower and dearer, but it was preferable because it yielded slabs that could be used in many ways and were often worth more than the extra cost of labour. With the axe, the wood removed was reduced to chips fit only for burning. Slabs had value only if the trunk was as straight as possible. The choice between the two methods depended on the size of the tree, the shape of the slab that could be obtained, its value in the district, and the difference in price between squaring by axe and by saw. Garraud made the same point. Depending on the shape of the trunk, the slab is sometimes thick enough to be used, and then it must be decided whether it pays to remove it with the saw instead of sacrificing it to the axe, which is quicker and cheaper.

Both works give a rule for the greatest thickness of the slab. The side of the largest square that can be cut from a log of radius R is √2R^{2}, that is, R√2. Half this width subtracted from the radius gives the greatest thickness of the slab, measured at its middle. Garraud took the radius from the girth measured at the thinnest point of the trunk and deducted the bark and sapwood before applying the rule. For a trunk 2.10 m round, he found a radius of 0.26 m after deducting 0.07 m, a square of 0.36 m and a slab 0.08 m thick. Biston and Hanus worked an example with a girth of 220 cm: a radius of 30 cm after deducting the bark gives a square of about 42 cm and a slab 9 cm thick. They also gave a drawing method. They noted that a tree 1.57 m round gives a square of 35 cm and four slabs 7 cm thick, each able to make two small rafters, and that a tree 1.25 m round gives a square of 28 cm and four slabs 6 cm thick, each able to yield a board 28 cm wide on one face, 18 cm on the other and 4 cm thick.

== Uses ==
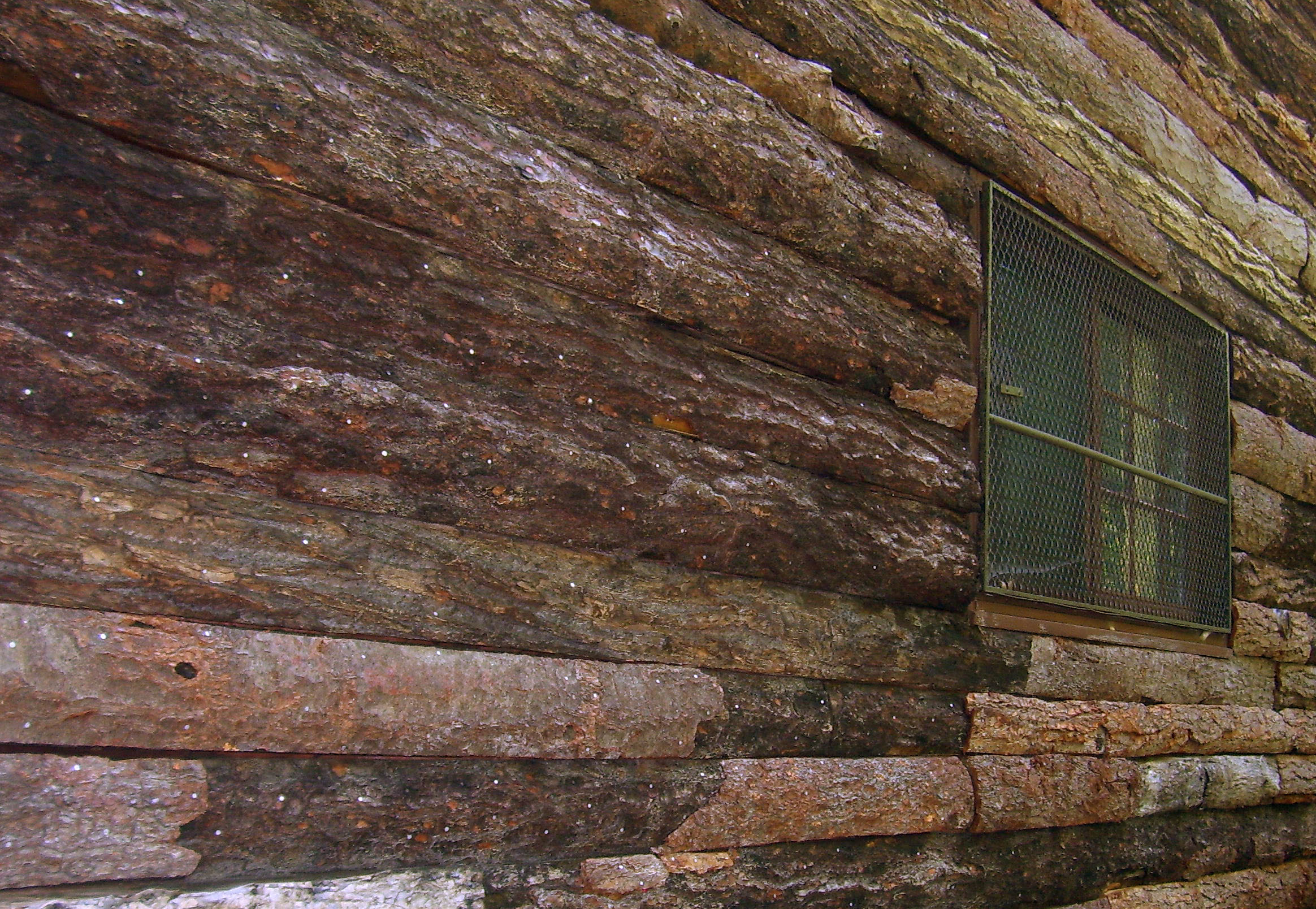
Slab siding, with the bark left on, at Slabsides, the cabin that the naturalist John Burroughs built in 1895 in West Park, New York

Slabs were generally left as waste, but they could be gathered and burned as fuel. Biston and Hanus wrote that slabs could be used in many ways, and that a thick slab from a straight trunk could be sawn into a board.

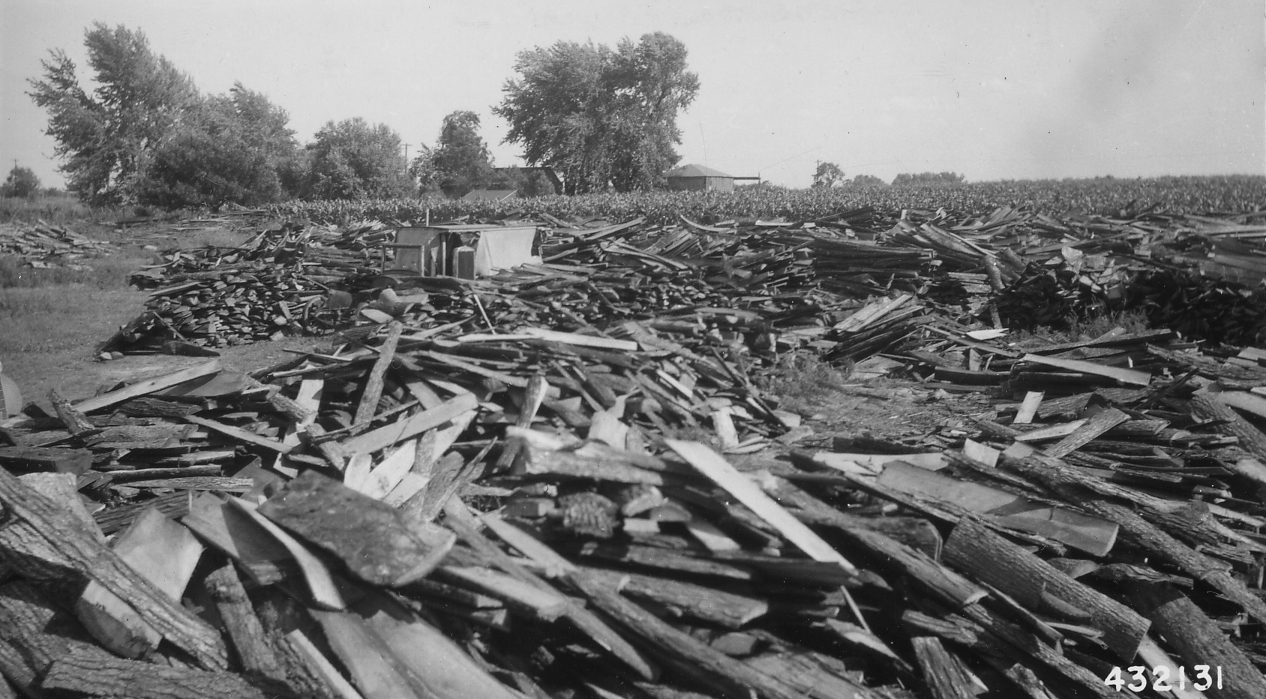
Slabwood from a railway-tie mill in Illinois in 1944, waiting to be cut for firewood

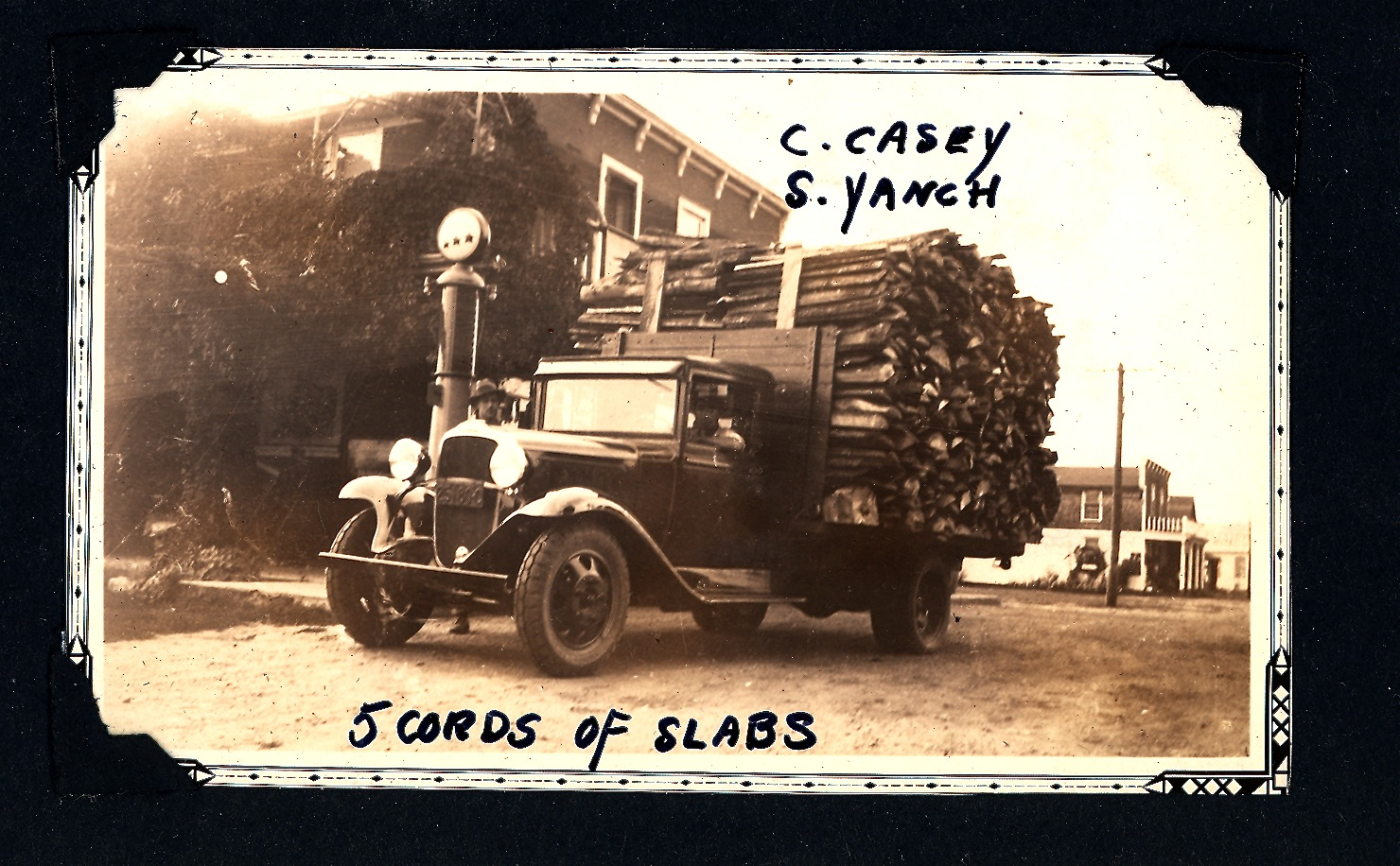
A truck delivering five cords of slabs to a store in Northbrook, Ontario

== Flat sawing ==
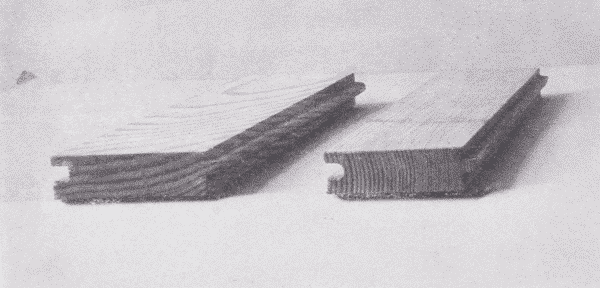
Flat-sawn ("slash-grain", left) and quarter-sawn ("comb-grain", right) flooring boards, from William Noyes, Handwork in Wood (1910)

In French, débit sur dosse ("sawing on the slab") is sawing parallel to the first slab taken from a log. The English terms are flat sawing, flat grain and slash grain. In the method also called débit par retournements successifs ("sawing by successive turnings"), the slabs are first removed from four faces of the log at right angles. A square-edged board is then taken from each flat face so created, the log being turned through 90° at each cut. Finally the central part is sawn into boards by a series of parallel cuts. In a board sawn this way, the growth rings meet the face at an acute angle, smaller than 45°.

Rondelet quoted the chemist Jean Henri Hassenfratz on the quality of boards cut in this way. Hassenfratz distinguished the curved lines of the growth rings from the straight lines running from the centre to the bark, which he called mailles (medullary rays). Boards from the centre of the log follow the rays. The outer boards are cut across them; they are very liable to split in drying, dry unevenly, and cup across their width.

== See also ==
- Live edge
- Lumber edger
- Quarter sawing
- Wood grain
