= Rip cut =

Type of cut in woodworking

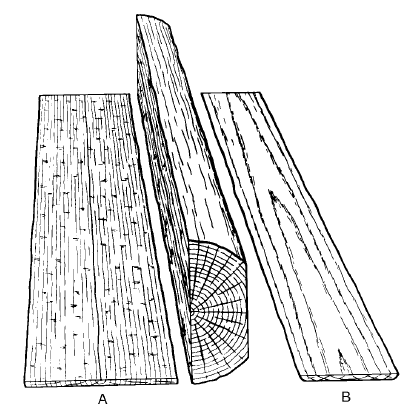
Rip cuts produce lumber of different cuts such as quarter sawn (A), flat or plain sawn (B), or rift sawn (other image).

The rift sawn rip cuts are perpendicular to the center of the log

In woodworking, a rip-cut is a type of cut that severs or divides a piece of wood parallel to the grain. The other typical type of cut is a cross-cut, a cut perpendicular to the grain. Unlike cross-cutting, which shears the wood fibers, a rip saw works more like a series of chisels, lifting off small splinters of wood. The nature of the wood grain requires the shape of the saw teeth to be different, thus the need for both rip saws and crosscut saws; however, some circular saw blades are combination blades and can make both types of cuts. A rip cut is the fundamental type of cut made at a sawmill.

== Definitions ==
Rip cut comes from rip: to split or saw timber in the direction of the grain, and cut: to divide with a sharp-edged instrument. Wood may also be split along the grain (riven), but the split will follow the grain and usually not be flat. Knots also prevent riving thus the need for rip cuts. A kerf is the opening in the wood made by the saw.

== Handsaws ==
Types of hand saws used to make rip cuts are rip saws, frame saws some of which are whipsaws, and veneer saws.

== Power saws ==
Rip cuts are commonly made with a table saw, but other types of power saws can also be used, including a radial arm saw, band saw, and hand held circular saw. In sawmills the head saw is the first rip-saw a log goes through, which is sometimes a gang-saw, and then the cants may be resawn using other saws and then edged in an edger and sometimes cut to length by a crosscut saw. Also, smaller portable sawmills and chainsaw mills use rip-cuts to produce lumber. Each time a piece of wood is rip cut it takes time and the kerf material turns into sawdust and loses value so the number and width of each rip cut influence the economics of the operation: This gives band saws an advantage over circular saws and chainsaws.

== Types of cuts ==
The types of rip-cuts influence the quality of the lumber. Plain-sawn is the most common type of cut where a log is repeatedly run through a saw and much of the lumber has wood grain nearly parallel to the width of the boards. Quarter sawn and rift-sawn wood is more time consuming and wasteful to produce but is of higher quality.

As a general rule, tools which work well for rip cutting do not work well for crosscutting. Most woodworkers thus have a table saw, which is used for rip cutting, and a separate chop or miter saw, which is used for crosscutting. Crosscut power-saws should never be used for ripping a board because it is very dangerous. Circular saw blades designed for rip cutting have a smaller number of larger teeth than similar blades designed for cross cutting. There are combination blades for table saws that can be used for ripping and cross cutting but should not be used for non through cuts such as dados and rabbets. If you use a radial arm saw to rip you need a blade with a negative hook angle for the teeth to keep the saw from lifting the board off the saw and kicking back.
