= Wane =

Wane may refer to:

== People ==
- Key Wane
- Shaun Wane (born 1964), English rugby league footballer and coach
- Taylor Wane (born 1968), British pornographic actress and model
- Wané Roonseraw

== Religion ==
- Vanir, a class of deity in Norse mythology

== Other ==
- Wane language
- Wane (wood), a rounded edge on a piece of lumber
- WANE-TV, a television station (channel 32, virtual 15) licensed to Fort Wayne, Indiana, United States
- Wax and Wane, 1982 song from Garlands album by Scottish band Cocteau Twins
