= Flat sawing =

Woodworking process

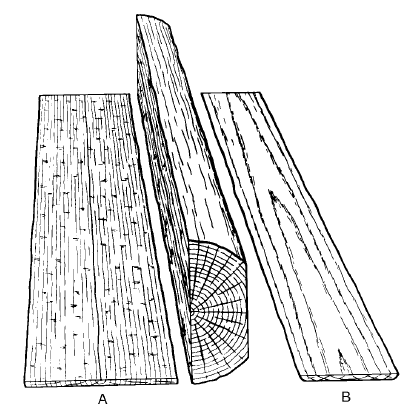
Lumber produced by flat sawing from a log. Plank A has been cut from the middle, and is as wide as the original log. Plank B has been cut closer to the side, and shows slash grain.

Flat sawing, flitch sawing or plain sawing is a woodworking process that produces flat-cut or plain-cut boards of lumber.

== Process ==
After an initial cut through the diameter of a log, parallel cuts produce flitches: strips of lumber with consistent thickness. Two cuts on each flitch trim the bark from the sides, and reduce it to a standard board width with squared edges. Two more cuts at each end set the length.

Lumber can be quickly flat-cut with a side-by-side set of mechanical saws. A slower but sturdier method involves passing the log back and forth over a single saw.

To reduce buckling that may occur along the middle of flat-cut boards, the initial cut may be offset from the diameter, and resulting sections cut further before cutting the flitches.

== Comparison ==
Flat-sawn wood often exhibits "flat-" or "slash grain", where the angle between the visible growth rings and the width of the board is 45° or less. This makes the wood vulnerable to deformation as it dries, or if later exposed to moisture. Flat-sawn wood is less stable than quarter sawn or rift sawn wood, but can be produced more quickly and at lower cost.

The face of the board may show curved grain, sometimes with intricate patterns.
