= Wane (wood) =

Rounded or bark-covered edge on a piece of sawn timber

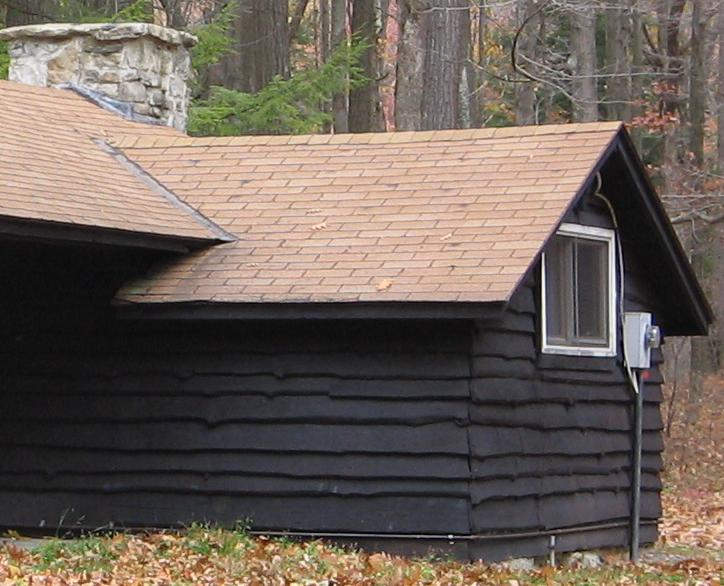
Wane on the siding boards of a cabin built by the Civilian Conservation Corps at Simon B. Elliott State Park, Pennsylvania

In woodworking, wane is the part of the rounded surface of a log that is left on a piece of sawn timber. English dictionaries define it as a defective edge or corner of a board or plank, where bark remains or wood is missing because of the curvature of the log. The Century Dictionary describes it as a bevelled edge on a board sawn from a log that has not been squared. A board with wane is waney or wany. In lumber, wane is a defect that grading rules limit; in furniture it may be kept on purpose as a live edge. The noun comes, through Middle English, from Old English wana, "defect". The French term is flache and the Spanish term is gema.

== Causes ==
Wane appears when planks or beams cannot be cut properly because the tree is curved or because the wood grain cannot be followed. A slab, the plank taken by the first cuts on the body of the tree, is a waney plank; the 1814 vocabulary of joinery of the architect J. M. R. Morisot describes it as good for little. In his vocabulary of carpentry, Morisot defined bois flache or bois flacheux as timber whose edges are not sharp and which could not be squared without much waste. He defined équarrir as cutting a log to give it a square shape, and dédosser as dressing a timber with the saw to sharp edges (vive-arête) by cutting away the waney parts.

== Grading and use ==
In lumber grading, wane is a defect. The Wood Handbook of the United States Forest Products Laboratory defines it as bark or lack of wood on the edge or corner of a piece of lumber, regardless of cause, except manufactured eased edges. Wane is one of the visual sorting criteria used to sort lumber into stress grades, with knots, slope of grain, checks and splits, shake, density, decay, annual ring count and percentage latewood, and pitch pockets. Requirements of appearance, fabrication, or ample bearing or nailing surfaces generally impose stricter limitations on wane than does strength. Wane is therefore limited in structural lumber on that basis. In practice, a grade often contains pieces with the strength of a higher grade, because of grade reduction for appearance factors such as wane that do not affect strength.

In furniture, the wane can instead be kept as a feature. Live edge furniture shows the rough, natural and irregular edge of the timber as a design element of the piece, rather than trimming the wood to straight lines. The American woodworker George Nakashima started the fashion. He made tables from slabs of wood and kept their natural edges; the Philadelphia Museum of Art describes the free-form natural edge of his 1960 Slab Coffee Table as his signature.

== Effect on strength ==
Wane reduces the cross-section of a piece of timber below the full rectangle, and it is one of the defects measured in the visual grading of timber. A 2007 study at the Technical University of Madrid tested 84 large-section beams of Scots pine and maritime pine taken from old buildings, 51 of them with wane. The bending strength, modulus of elasticity and density of the pieces with wane were very similar to those of the pieces without it, and the differences were not statistically significant. The authors suggested that the loss of section is offset by the greater continuity of the fibres at the surface, which are not cut at a wane as they are on a sharp-edged piece, and by the shape of the section. They called for more tests on newly sawn timber to confirm the result, and proposed that wane could be disregarded, within limits, when grading the timber of existing structures, where the Spanish grading standard UNE 56544 would otherwise reject 38% of the large-section pieces.
