= Wiggleboard =

Wiggleboard is a special kind of plywood-like wood that is designed to be bent along one of its two axes, also known as "bendable plywood" or "bending plywood".

Unlike regular plywood that has the grains running at right angles to each other in each layer, wiggleboard has all the grains running the same way, and is designed to be easily rolled up or bent along one axis, and stiff along another axis that is at right angles to that one axis.

It can be used to quickly make any developable surface.
