= Resaw =

Large band saw

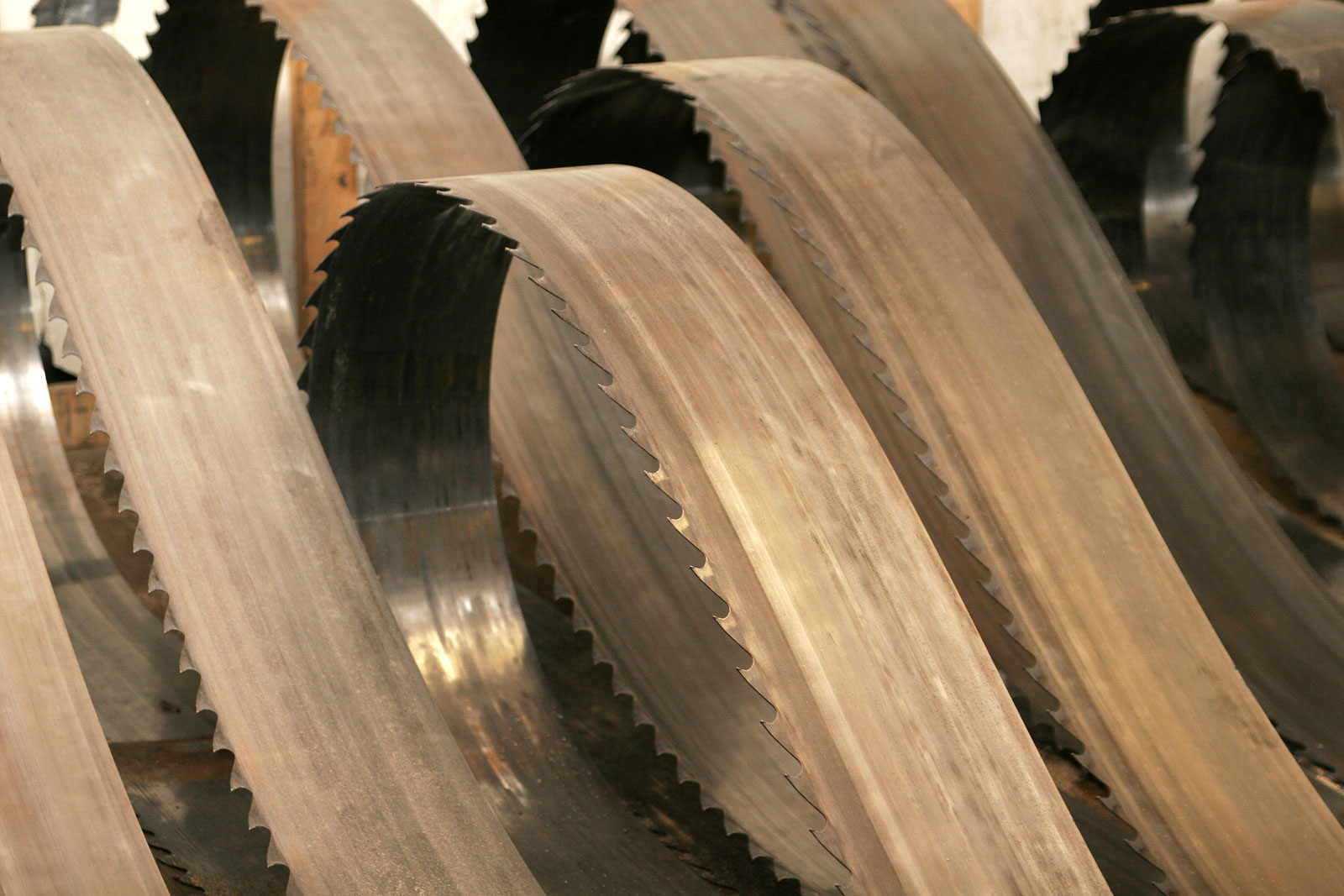
Resaw blades used in a sawmill.

A resaw is a large band saw optimized for cutting timber along the grain to reduce larger sections into smaller sections or veneers. Resawing veneers requires a wide blade – commonly 2–3 in (51–76 mm) – with a small kerf to minimize waste. Resaw blades of up to 1 in (25 mm) may be fitted to a standard band saw. Many small and medium-sized sawmills use 1–1.5 in (25–38 mm) to band saw blades.

Timber mills use larger resaws to ripcut large planks into smaller sizes. A typical mill sized resaw blade is eight inches wide and made with 16 gauge steel. Resaw blades can be identified by their straight back, as opposed to headsaws and doublecut blades, which have notched or toothed backs.
