= Crooked Forest =

Forest of unusual pine trees in Poland

Crooked Forest Polish: Krzywy Las
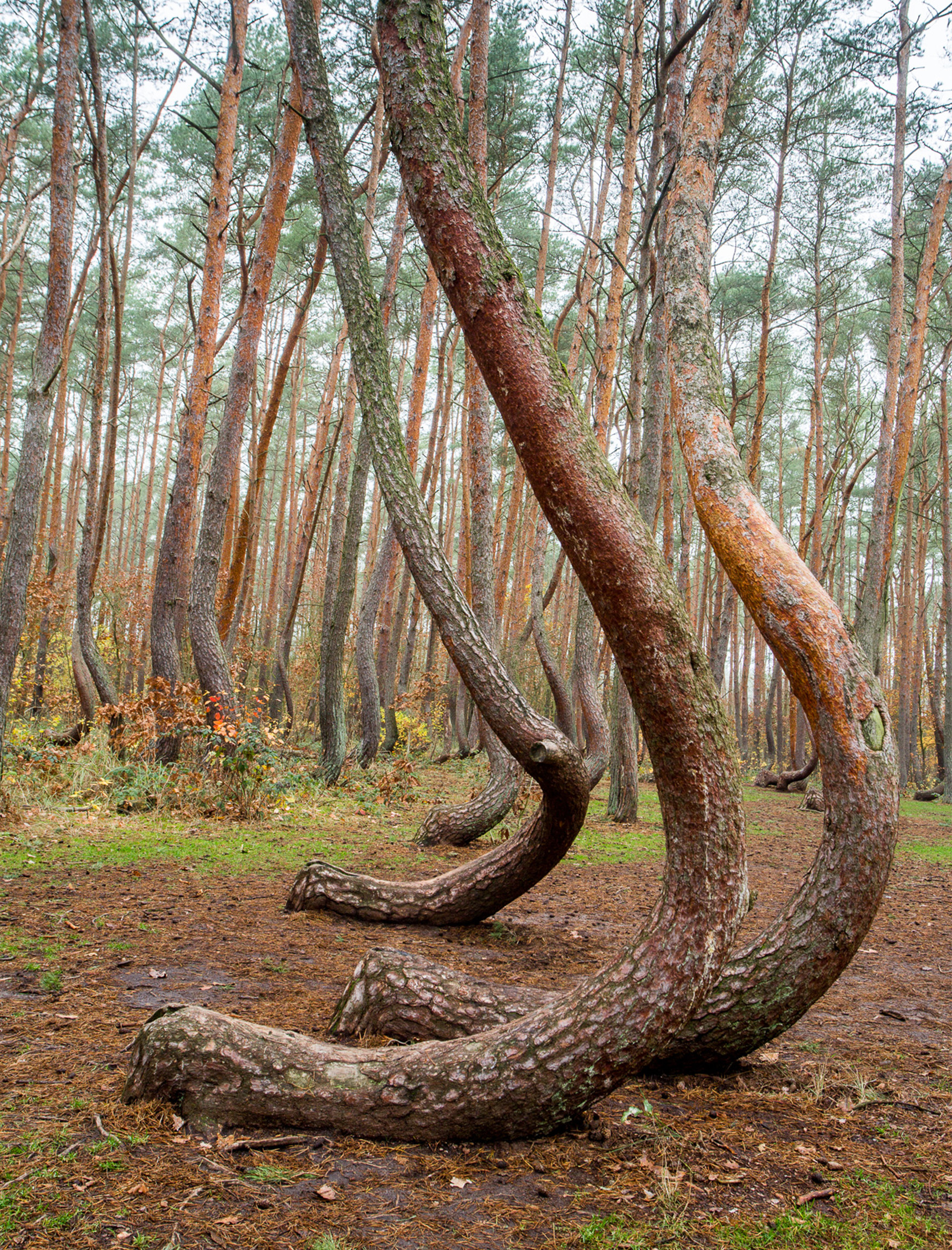

- Location within Poland
- Interactive map of Crooked Forest

Geography
- Location: Gryfino County, West Pomeranian Voivodeship, Poland
- Coordinates: 53°12′50″N 14°28′30″E

Administration
- Status: Natural monument of Poland

Ecology
- Dominant tree species: Scots pine

The Crooked Forest (Polish: Krzywy Las) is a grove of oddly-shaped Scots pine trees located in the village of Nowe Czarnowo near the town of Gryfino, West Pomerania, in north-western Poland. It is a protected natural monument of Poland.

This grove of 400 pines was planted in around 1930. Each pine tree bends sharply to the north, just above ground level, then curves back upright after a sideways excursion of one to three meters (3–9 feet). The curved pines are enclosed by a surrounding forest of straight pine trees. The trees grow to about 50 feet (15 m) in height. At the time of planting this location was part of the German province of Pomerania.

It is generally believed that some form of human tool or technique was used to make the trees grow or bend this way, but the method has never been determined, and remains a mystery to this day. It has been speculated that the trees may have been deformed to create naturally curved timber for use in furniture or boat building. Others surmise that a snowstorm could have bent the trunks, but there is little evidence of that.

The forest was featured in season 1, episode 4 of The UnXplained on the History channel titled "Unnatural Nature" that first aired on 9 August 2019.

The site is open to the public and is a tourist attraction in the region.

== See also ==
- Dancing Forest
- Drunken trees
- Tree shaping
- Wood warping
