= Drunken trees =

Stand of trees displaced from their normal vertical alignment

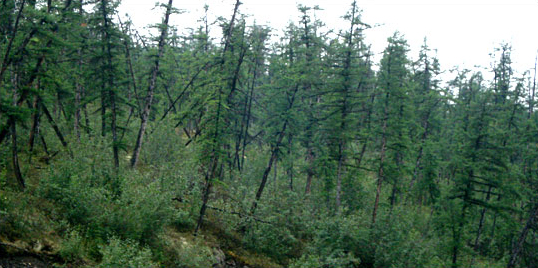
A drunken forest in Siberia caused by melting permafrost (NASA photo).

Drunken trees, tilted trees, or a drunken forest, is a stand of trees rotated from their normal vertical alignment.

This commonly occurs in northern subarctic taiga forests of black spruce (Picea mariana) under which discontinuous permafrost or ice wedges have melted, causing trees to tilt at various angles.

Tilted trees may also be caused by frost heaving, and subsequent palsa development, hummocks, earthflows, forested active rock glaciers, landslides, or earthquakes. In stands of spruce trees of equal age that germinated in the permafrost active layer after a fire, tilting begins when the trees are 50 to 100 years old, suggesting that surface heaving from new permafrost aggradation can also create drunken forests.

== Permafrost ==
Permafrost, which is soil (or rock) that remains below 0 °C for at least two consecutive years, forms a solid matrix in soil which can extend to a depth of hundreds of meters. The permafrost prevents trees from developing deep root systems; for example, the black spruce that has adapted to permafrost soils has no significant taproot. In areas where the permafrost temperature is near the melting point of water, climate variations, or loss of surface vegetation from fire, flooding, construction, or deforestation, can thaw the upper extents of the permafrost, creating a thermokarst, the scientific name for a ground slump caused by melting permafrost. The thermokarst undermines the shallow root bed of these trees, causing them to lean or fall. Thermokarst lakes are surrounded by a ring of drunken trees leaning toward the lake, which makes these land features easily identifiable.

Drunken trees may eventually die from their displacement, and in ice-rich permafrost, the entire drunken forest ecosystem can be destroyed by melting. Tilted trees that do not topple over may recover by using gravitropism to resume vertical growth, thereby taking on a curved shape. The reaction wood formed by this process can be studied using dendrochronology using annual growth rings to determine when the tree was subjected to tilting.

== Relationship to climate change ==
Drunken trees are not a completely new phenomenon—dendrochronological evidence can date thermokarst tilting back to at least the 19th century. The southern extent of the subarctic permafrost reached a peak during the Little Ice Age of the 16th and 17th centuries, and has been in decline since then.

Permafrost is typically in disequilibrium with climate, and much of the permafrost that remains is in a relict state. However, the rate of thawing has been increasing, and a great deal of the remaining permafrost is expected to thaw during the 21st century.

Al Gore cited drunken trees caused by melting permafrost in Alaska as evidence of global warming, as part of his presentation in the 2006 documentary film An Inconvenient Truth. Similar warming leading to permafrost thawing in neighboring Siberia has been attributed to a combination of anthropogenic climate change, a cyclical atmospheric phenomenon known as the Arctic oscillation, and albedo positive feedbacks caused by both when melting ice exposes bare ground and ocean which absorb, rather than reflect, solar radiation.

== See also ==
- Crooked Forest
- Dancing Forest
- Effects of global warming
- Wood warping
