= Quarter sawing =

Woodworking process

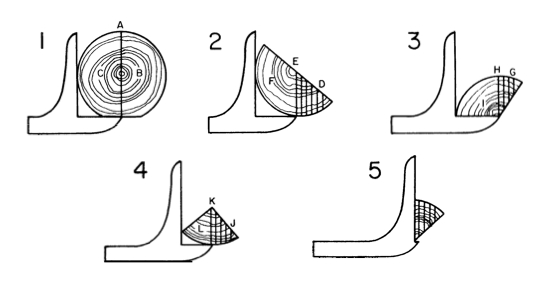
A method for logs 16–19 in (41–48 cm)

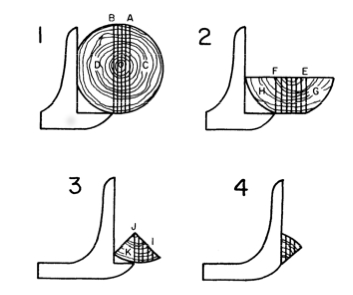
A method for logs over 19 in (48 cm)

Quarter sawing or quartersawing is a woodworking process that produces quarter-sawn or quarter-cut boards in the rip cutting of logs into lumber. The resulting lumber can also be called radially-sawn or simply quartered. There is widespread confusion between the terms rift sawn and quarter sawn, with the terms defined both with opposite meanings and as synonyms.

Quarter-sawn boards have greater stability of form and size with less cupping (compared to flatsawn boards), shrinkage across the width, shake and splitting, and other good qualities. In some woods such as oak, the wood grain produces a decorative effect which shows a prominent ray fleck, while sapele is likely to produce a ribbon figure. Rift sawn boards are less dimensionally stable, but have straight grain on all four sides, while quarter sawn boards have straight grain on two sides.

== Description ==
Quarter sawing is a process for rip cutting logs into lumber. It produces quarter-sawn or quarter-cut boards. The resulting lumber can also be called radially-sawn or simply quartered.

Wood cut in this way is prized for certain applications, but it will tend to be more expensive as well. In cutting a log, quarter-sawn boards can be produced in several ways. However, if a log is cut for maximum yield, it will produce only a few quarter-sawn boards among the total. Conversely, if a log is cut to produce only quarter-sawn boards, there will be boards with less width and considerable waste.

== Process ==
End of log diagram showing where cuts occur for flat sawing, rift sawing and quarter sawing.

When boards are cut from a log, they are usually rip cut along the length (axis) of the log. This can be done in three ways: plain-sawing (most common, also known as flat-sawn, bastard-sawn, through and through, and tangent-sawn), quarter-sawing (less common), or rift sawing (rare).

In flat sawing, the log is passed through the blade, cutting off plank after plank without changing the orientation of the blade or log. The resulting planks have different growth ring orientations when viewed from the end. The relative angle that forms the rings and the surface goes from almost zero degrees in the external planks to nearly ninety degrees at the core of the log.

Quarter sawing gets its name from the fact that the log is first quartered lengthwise, resulting in wedges with a right angle ending at approximately the center of the original log. Each quarter is then cut separately by tipping it up on its point and sawing boards successively along the axis. The result is boards with growth rings mostly perpendicular to the faces. Quarter sawing yields boards with straight striped grain lines, greater stability than flatsawn wood, and a distinctive ray and fleck figure in some woods, especially oak species. It also yields narrower boards, because the log is first quartered, which is more wasteful.

Quarter-sawn boards can also be produced by cutting a board from one flat face of the quarter, flipping the wedge onto the other flat face to cut the next board, and so on.

The William Ritter Lumber Company (1890–1960), famous for its Appalachian oak flooring and other products, used a modified technique to reduce waste:

1. bark and a few boards were removed from two opposite sides of the log;
2. the log was cut in half (possibly, four quarters);
3. each piece was placed on the flat side, and "quarter-sawn" lumber was cut.

=== Comparison to rift sawing ===
Quarter sawing is sometimes confused with the much less common "rift sawing." In quarter-sawn wood, only the center board of the quarter-log is cut with the growth rings truly perpendicular to the surface of the board. The smaller boards cut from either side have grain increasingly skewed. Riftsawn wood has every board cut along a radius of the original log, so each board has a perpendicular grain, with the growth rings oriented at right angles to the surface of the board. However, since this produces a great deal of waste (in the form of wedge-shaped scraps from between the boards), rift-sawing is very seldom used. Quarter-sawn wood is an expensive, premium product, with the best dimensional stability of all cuts. Flatsawn wood (which, especially in oak, will often display the distinct "cathedral window" grain) is the least expensive and least dimensionally stable cut of wood. Rift-sawn wood, which has straight grain visible on all four sides is also expensive because it has more waste, like quarter sawn wood. All flat sawn logs will have a small amount of quarter sawn and rift sawn wood.

The process indicated in the US as "quarter sawing" yields a few quarter-sawn boards, but mostly rift-sawn boards.

== Characteristics ==
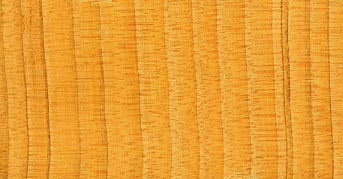
Quarter sawn surface, showing ray fleck (modest in this case)

Clear quarter sawn surface in a deck plank

Quarter-sawn boards have advantages compared to flat-sawn ones: they are more resistant to warping with changes in moisture, and while shrinkage can occur, it is less troublesome.

In high-end string instruments, the neck and fretboards are often made from quarter-sawn wood, since these structures must remain stable throughout the life of the instrument, to keep the tone and playability as invariable as possible. In acoustic guitars, quarter-sawn wood is also often used for the sides, which must be steam-bent to produce compound curves. This is partly for structural reasons, but also for the aesthetics of highly figured timbers being highlighted when sawn this way. On high-end electric guitars and bass guitars, quarter-sawn wood is often used as the base material for the neck of the guitar, since this makes for a stronger and straighter neck which aids tuning, setup, and stability.

Another advantage of quarter-sawn wood is the decorative pattern on the board, although this depends on the timber species. Flat sawn wood (especially oak) will often display a prominent wavy grain (sometimes called a cathedral-window pattern) caused by the saw cutting at a tangent to a growth ring. In quarter-sawn wood the saw cuts across the growth rings and the visible grain is much straighter. It is this evenness of the grain that gives quarter-sawn lumber its greater stability.

In addition to the grain, quarter-sawn wood (particularly oak) will also often display a pattern of medullary rays, seen as subtle wavy ribbon-like patterns across the straight grain. Medullary rays grow radially in the living tree, so while flat-sawing would cut across the rays, quarter-sawing puts them on the face of the board. This ray pattern has made quarter-sawn wood especially desirable for furniture and decorative panelling.

Quarter-sawn oak was a key feature of the decorative style of the American Arts and Crafts movement, particularly the work of Gustav Stickley, who said "The quarter-sawing method of cutting... renders quarter-sawn oak structurally stronger, also finer in grain, and, as shown before, less liable to warp and check than when sawn in any other way." Cheaper copies of Stickley's furniture were sometimes made with the less-expensive ash stained to resemble oak, but its lack of rays can identify it.

== See also ==
- Board foot
