= Head saw =

Log saw

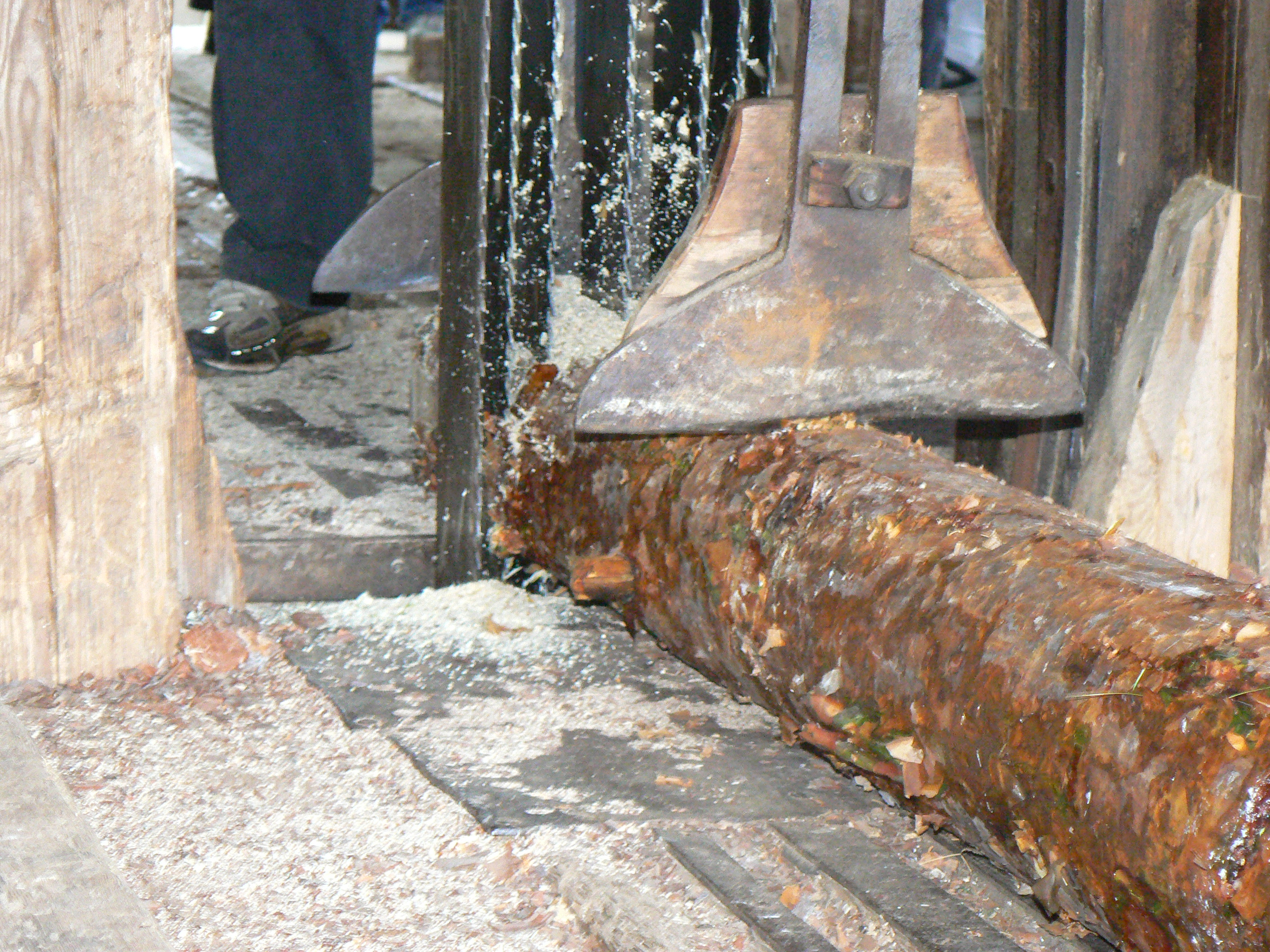
A type of head saw called a gang saw because of the "gang" of blades used together.

A head saw, framesaw, gang saw or head rig is the saw that makes the initial cuts in a log at a sawmill, turning a log into cants, or planks of wood.

== History ==
The original powered head saw was composed of long, narrow blades that used an up-and-down motion, a reciprocating saw. Each blade was set at a fixed width meaning each log was cut identically, regardless of flaws. This design was not energy efficient and around 1860 sawmills began to adopt the more efficient circular saw. In the 1870s, the limitation of log size due to the radius of the circular saw was improved with the introduction of the double circular saw- with one blade atop the other. In the 1880s, the band saw was introduced and was able to allow the head saw to handle logs of nearly unlimited size, ideal for the Californian redwoods.

== Modern use ==
Today, head saws are mostly used for cutting logs 16 to 72 inches (0.41 to 1.83 m) in diameter depending upon the type of band mill the saws are mounted on. More optimized machines such as curve saws now cut the smaller diameters since they are far more efficient and can provide greater production.

Dependent upon the log diameter, head saws can cut a log at speeds ranging from 1 to 300 feet per minute (0.30 to 91.44 m/min). Generally, log carriage speeds are adjustable for optimal performance.

=== Operation ===
A head saw is operated by a head sawyer. The sawyer positions the log to the proper position for the initial cut while sizing up the log determining optimal usage. The offbearer is responsible for removing the cut boards.

== See also ==
- Lumber Edger
- Resaw
- Sawmill
