= Dancing Forest =

Unusual pine forest in Kaliningrad Oblast, Russia

Coordinates: 55°10′48″N 20°51′43″E

The Dancing Forest (Russian: Танцующий лес, romanized: Tantsuyushchiy les) is a pine forest on the Curonian Spit in Kaliningrad Oblast, Russia noted for its unusually twisted trees. Unlike drunken trees, the trees in the Dancing Forest are twisted into several patterns, such as rings, hearts and convoluted spirals bending to the ground. The exact cause of the trees' distortion is unknown. According to one hypothesis, the distortion is caused by the activity of caterpillars (Rhyacionia buoliana). In a folk story, the Dancing Forest follows the movement of the sands. Trees of such unusual shapes are found throughout the Curonian Spit.

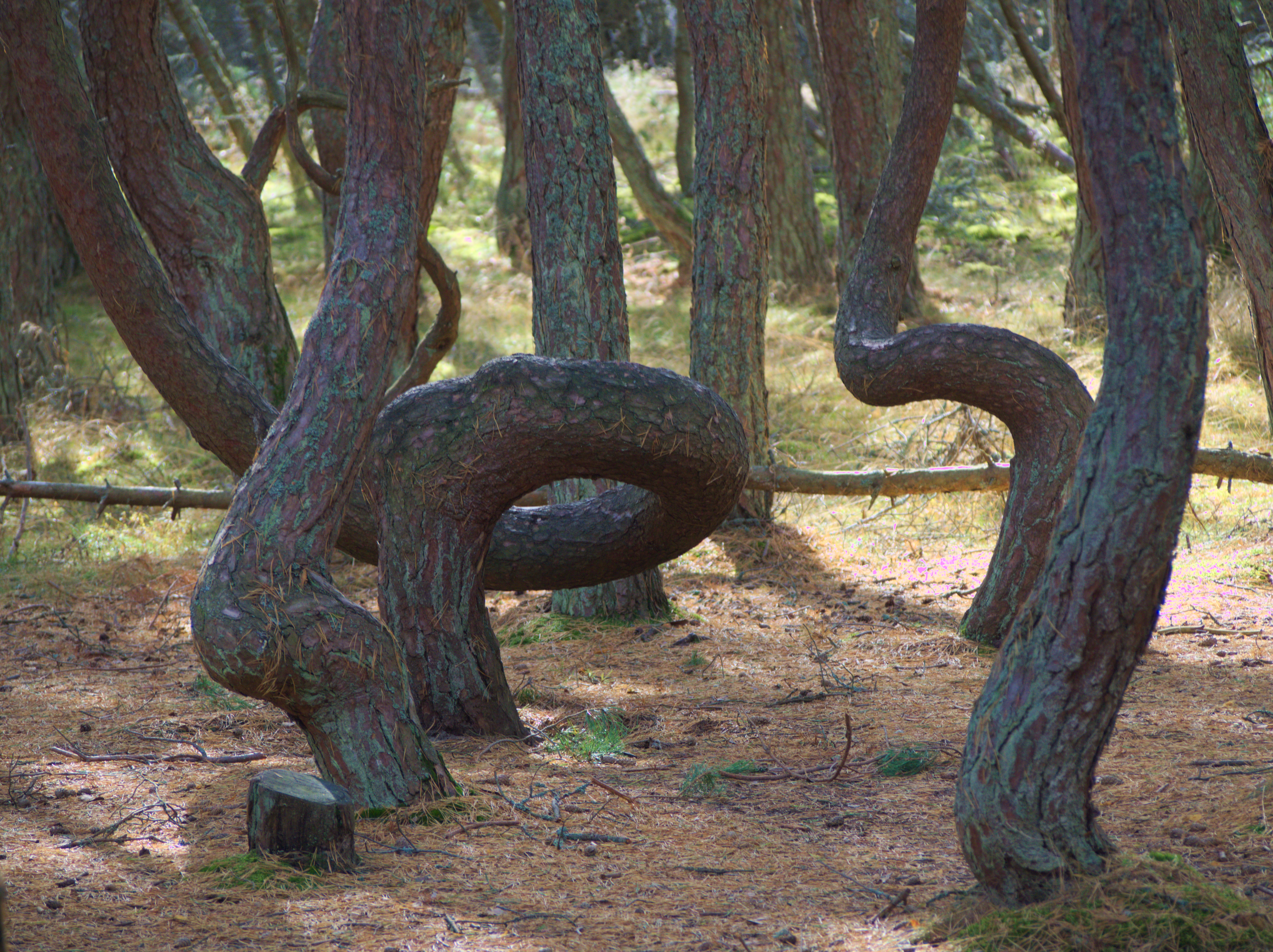
The Dancing Forest

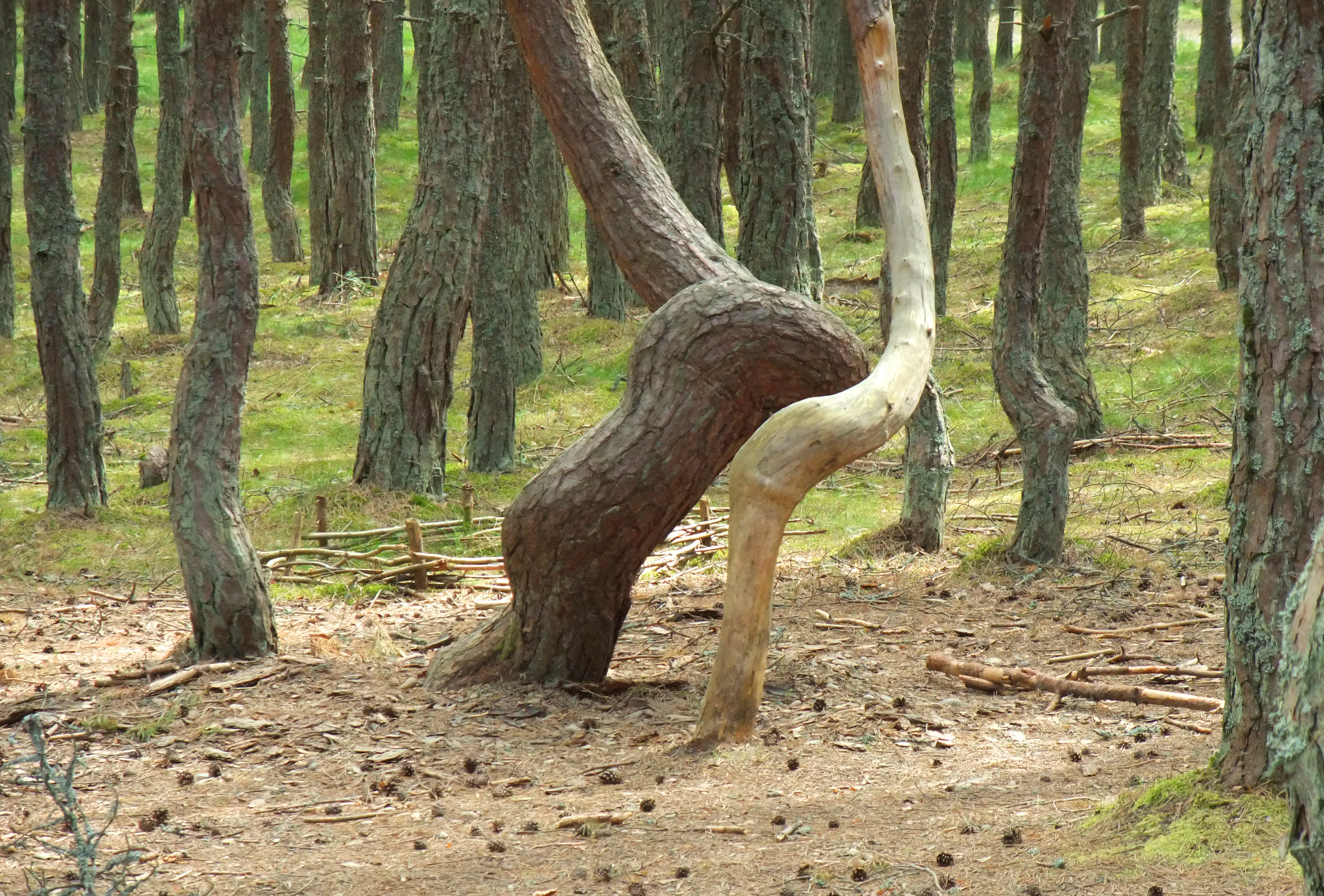
The Dancing Forest

== History ==
The trees were planted in the 1960s. Before World War II, the site accommodated a Nazi-German gliding school.

== See also ==
- Crooked Forest
