= Timber grading =

Process of classifying timber based on its quality and strength

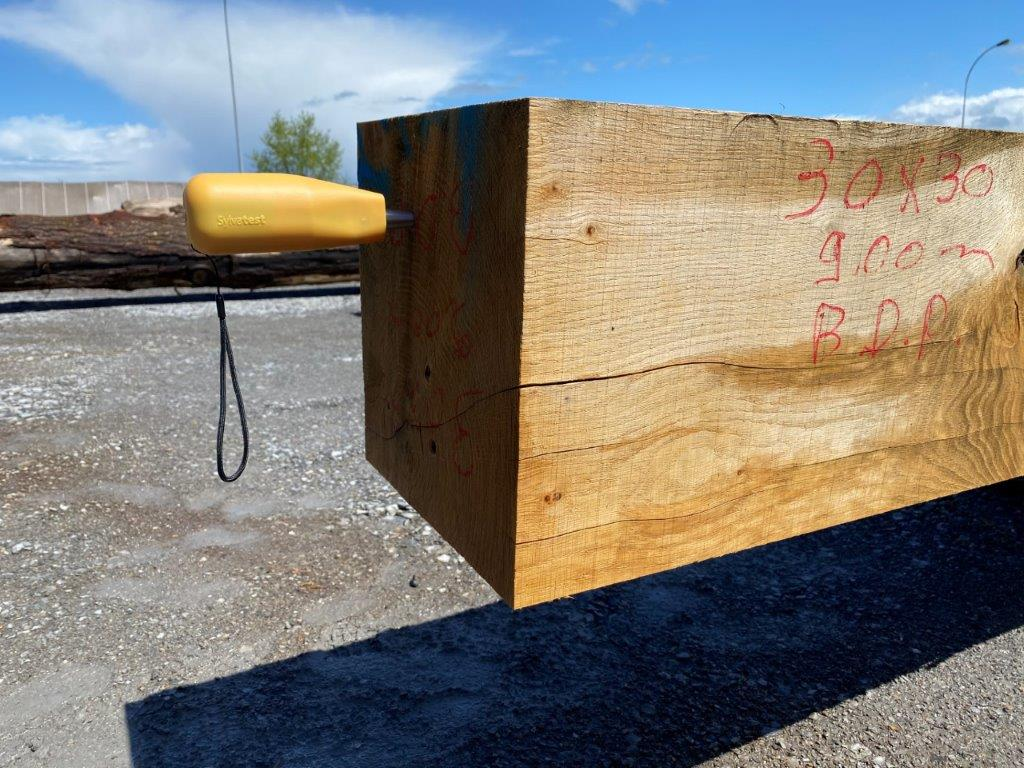
Diagnostic grading of squared oak timber using a certified test, the Sylvatest.

Timber grading is a technical process of evaluating and classifying solid timber and other wood products. This is based on the physical characteristics and the mechanical strength of the material. This classification process verifies that wood products or timber elements can meet the industry standards, and they are appropriate for use in construction, furniture making, and other applications.

== Grading methods ==
Timber grading is typically carried out using these two methods:

=== Visual grading ===
Visual grading is the eye inspection of the timber by trained graders. These technicians can evaluate the wood knots, grain patterns, and other defects. This method is simple and cost effective.

=== Machine grading ===
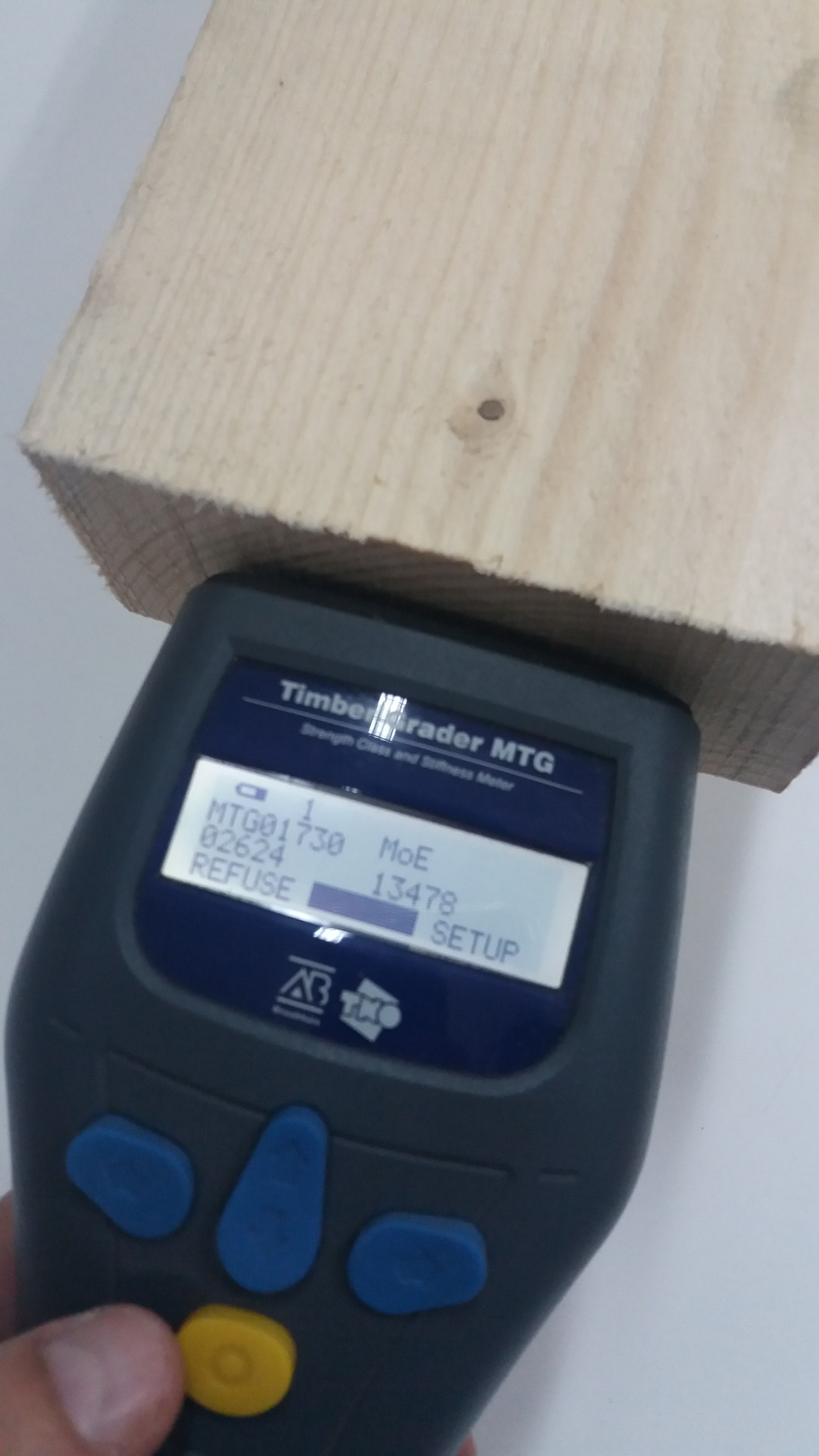
Grading a wood element by Timber Grader, a certified device.

Machine grading of timber uses mechanical devices to assess the strength and stiffness of the material. This method can yield more objective results in comparison to visual grading.

== Standards and applications ==
Several established standards are used to ensure stability and reproducibility in timber grading:

- In Europe, the EN 14081-1 standard specifies requirements for strength-graded structural timber.
- The EN 338 standard defines the strength classes of the structural timber.
- In the USA, the National Hardwood Lumber Association (NHLA) provides the rules for hardwood lumber grading, based upon the size and number of clear cuttings.

When the timber is graded, its overall durability and mechanical performance can be assured in:

- Construction: Structural timber should meet specific strength requirements for buildings and infrastructure.
- Furniture making: Wood products, or solid timber which is free of defects, is commonly used for furniture and furniture items.
- Packaging: Lower-grade timber is widely used for wooden pallets, boxes and crates.

== Strength classes ==
In Europe, according to the standards EN 338 and EN 14081, timber is subjected to various assessment methods. Based on the final results, a strength class is assigned for each structural wood element. This classification system assures all of the structural applications. For hardwoods, classification starts with letter 'D', and available hardwood classes include these: D24, D30, D40, D50, D60, and D70.

For softwoods, which are the major structural species used, classes labelled with letter 'C' are distinguished in the softwood grades: C14, C16, C18, C24, C27, or (rarely) higher. Mostly, the classes C24 and C27 are used.

== See also ==
- Lumber
- Woodworking
- Structural engineering
- Building code
