= Live edge =

Style of furniture incorporating natural edges

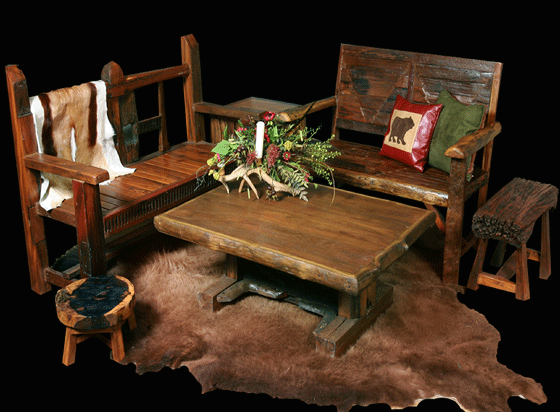
Rustic furniture vignette featuring a live edge coffee table

Live edge or natural edge is a style of furniture where the furniture designer or craftsperson incorporates the natural edge of the wood ("wane") into the design of the piece. Live edge furniture often incorporates gnarly wood, such as Alligator Juniper, mesquite, Vachellia nilotica and salvaged wood that could not be used in conventional woodworking. There are special challenges involved in working with this type of wood, and several methods for live edge have developed. Some leave the natural holes and cracks in the wood while other artists fill them with resins.

== Origins ==
Live edge is a mixture of "Western" and rustic furniture styles. Originally it was categorized as rustic, but the two styles have many differences.

Live edge furniture is believed to have originated around the 1600s in America, when settlers were beginning to establish themselves by building homes on the territory. The settlers required functional furniture quickly, so opted for basic pieces made from unfinished wood. As the settlement of America progressed, the practice of live edge furniture became less popular.

== Practitioners ==
George Nakashima, winner of the Institute of Architects' Gold Craftsmanship Medal, is known for leaving the natural edge of the wood as part of the finished piece including in his series for Knoll in 1946. His style is considered an extension of the Arts and Crafts movement and employs craftsmanship that Nakashima said was "not only a creative force, but a moral idea." Mixing Japanese, American and International Modern style he designed furniture lines for Knoll and Widdicomb-Mueller "using timber organically and deliberately chose boards with knots, burrs and figured grain."

== In popular culture ==
In 2012, The Ellen DeGeneres Show featured a live edge coffee table as a part of the set design. The table was made up of two separate pieces, and typically held an arrangement of flowers along with cast beverages. The table was replaced with another design in 2018.
