= Rift sawing =

Woodworking process

Rift sawing is a woodworking process that aims to produce lumber that is less vulnerable to distortion than flat-sawn lumber. Rift-sawing may be done strictly along a log's radials—perpendicular to the annular growth ring orientation or wood grain—or as part of the quarter sawing process.

== Process ==
Leading to some confusion, the terms "rift sawing" and "quarter sawing" are interchanged between various sources.

=== Radial cut ===
Civil Engineering Materials describes rift-sawing as a process where boards are cut radially. Thus, the grain is always nearly parallel to the short edge of the board and thus nearly perpendicular to the long edge of the board. This produces stable boards with comparatively thin grain; least susceptible to warping, twisting, or cupping; and hence most valued for products where dimensional stability is critical (e.g., musical instruments, high-end sports equipment).

This is similar to the process used to make wood shingles. The word rift derives from rive, which describes the splitting of a bolt of lumber along its radius.

The Architectural Woodwork Institute (AWI) refers to such cuts as having "radial" or "edge grain", but does not describe them as "rift sawn".

=== Quarter cut ===
Sources such as Band Saw Fundamentals refer to quarter round logs cut at a diagonal to the initial quartering cuts as being "rift sawn". Central boards correspond to the radial cuts described above, while lateral boards will have more angled grain.

Rift-sawing may also be described as lumber produced during the latter stages of stepped cuts on a quarter round, where the subsequent cuts are parallel to either of the initial quartering cuts. The AWI defines "rift sawing" as a technique of cutting boards from logs so the grain is between 30–60° to the face of the board, with 45 degrees being "optimum". In Understanding Wood, Hoadley describes "rift grain" as occurring at an angle between 45–90° to the surface, and describes the AWI definition as "bastard sawn".

== Comparison ==

Compared to other sawing methods, radially cut rift-sawn lumber is more difficult to produce, and results in much more waste in the form of wedges. The thin grain reduces the appearance of "ray fleck", markings occurring on some wood species (such as white oak) from shallow cuts through medullary rays.

Diagonal- and stepped-cut rift-sawing is intermediate to flat-sawn and radial cut lumber. The angle of the bastard grain may differ along the width of the board or between opposing sides, and enhances the appearance of ray fleck.

Flat-sawing is the quickest method, producing the least wood waste and the largest possible boards from a log. However, it can produce boards that are more susceptible to cupping and shrinkage. The grain is often irregular, and may display loops, hyperbolas, and more elaborate patterns depending on species.

Quarter-sawing produces smaller boards than flat sawing but has a straighter grain. This process takes many more steps, especially if later cuts are alternated rather than parallel.
