= Lumber edger =

Lumbering device

A lumber edger is a device with saws used to straighten and smooth rough lumber or bowed stock by making a cut along the sides of the boards. The result of this process is dimensional lumber.

In a saw mill the edger is next in line from the head saw. The feed and press rollers on the edger are usually powered, passing the lumber through the machine. The length of feed and tables depends upon the lumber produced by the head saw.

Edgers can be categorized as gang or shifting edgers. In gang edgers the saws remain stationary. In a shifting edger the saws can move left or right independently of one another. This allows setting the saws to best maximize the product that can be produced from a particular cant.

The gang edger was invented by Orrin Henry Ingram in the late 1840s, while he was working at the Harris and Bronson Company at the company's lumber mill near Pharaoh Lake, New York.

== See also ==
- Sawmill
- Resaw
