= Wood warping =

Deviation from flatness in timber

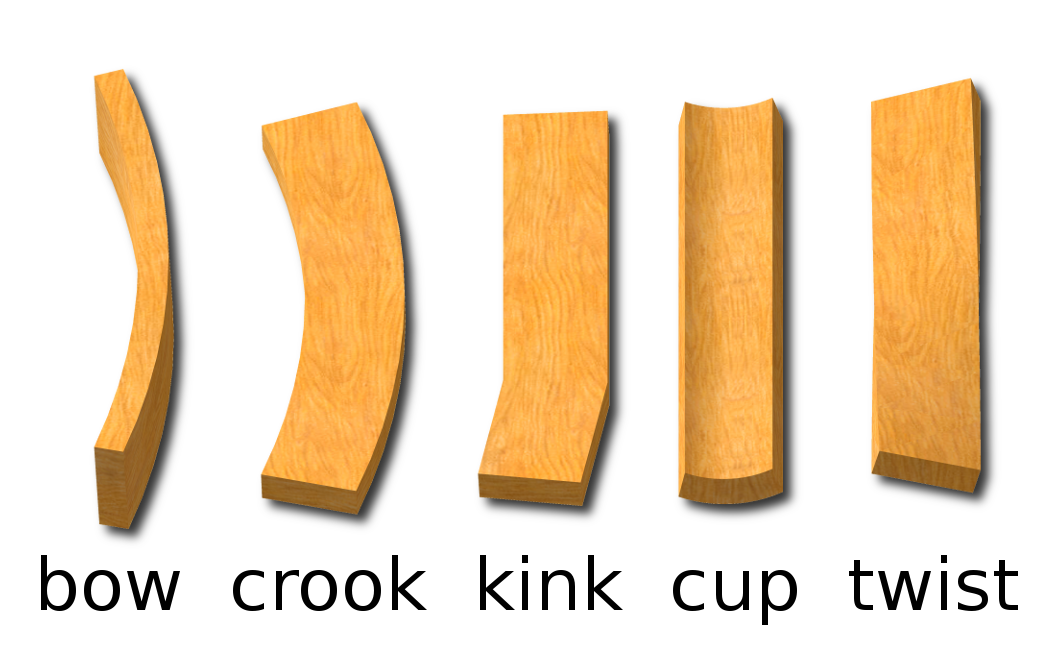
Different types of wood warping

Wood warping is a deviation from flatness in timber as a result of internal residual stress caused by uneven shrinkage. Warping primarily occurs due to uneven expansion or contraction caused by changes in moisture content. Warping can occur in wood considered "dry" (wood can take up and release moisture indefinitely) when it takes up moisture unevenly, or when it is allowed to return to its "dry" equilibrium state unevenly, too slowly, or too quickly. Many factors can contribute to wood warp susceptibility: wood species, grain orientation, air flow, sunlight, uneven finishing, temperature, and cutting season.

The types of wood warping include:

- bow: a warp along the length of the face of the wood
- crook: a warp along the length of the edge of the wood
- kink: a localized crook, often due to a knot
- cup: a warp across the width of the face, in which the edges are higher or lower than the center of the wood
- twist or wind: a distortion in which the two ends do not lie on the same plane. Winding sticks assist in viewing this defect.
- curl: a warp in the center that creates a sort of bow

Wood warping costs the wood industry in the U.S. millions of dollars per year. Straight wood boards that leave a cutting facility sometimes arrive at the store yard warped. Although wood warping has been studied for years, the warping control model for manufacturing composite wood hasn't been updated for about 40 years.

Zhiyong Cai, a researcher at Texas A&M University, has researched wood warping and was working on a computer software program in 2003 to help manufacturers make changes in the manufacturing process so that wood doesn't arrive at its destination warped after it leaves the mill or factory.

== See also ==
- Drunken trees
- Forest pathology
- Dancing Forest
- Crooked Forest
