= Sawmill =

Facility where logs are cut into lumber

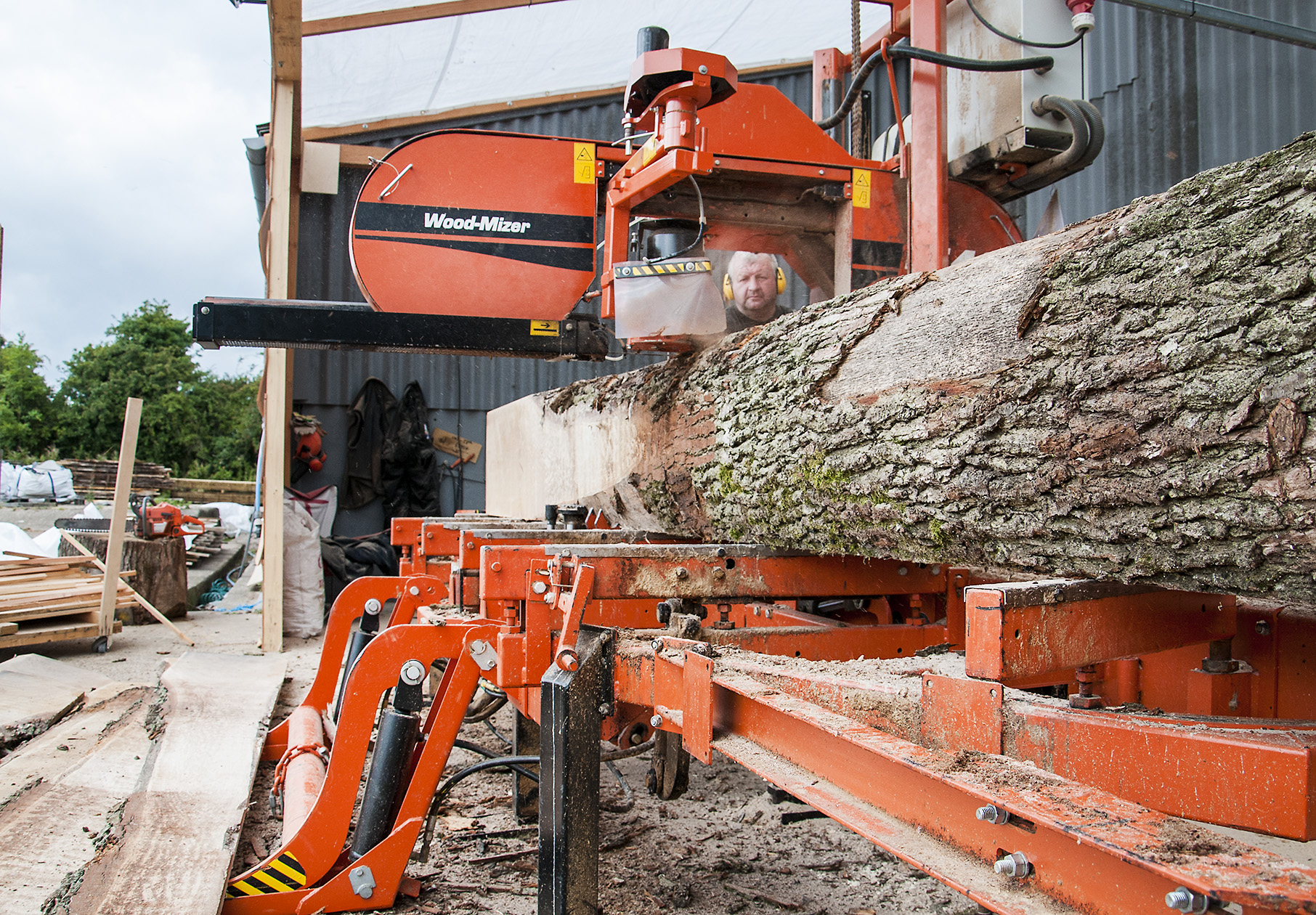
Sawing logs into finished lumber with a basic "portable" sawmill

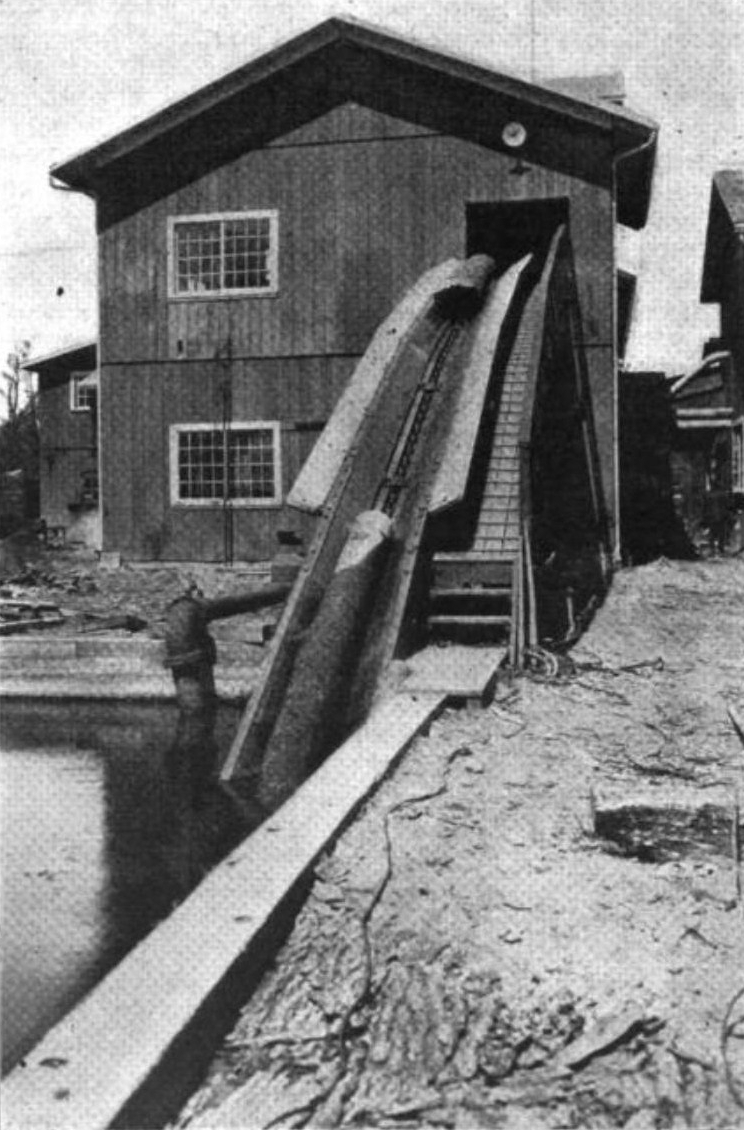
An American sawmill, c. 1920

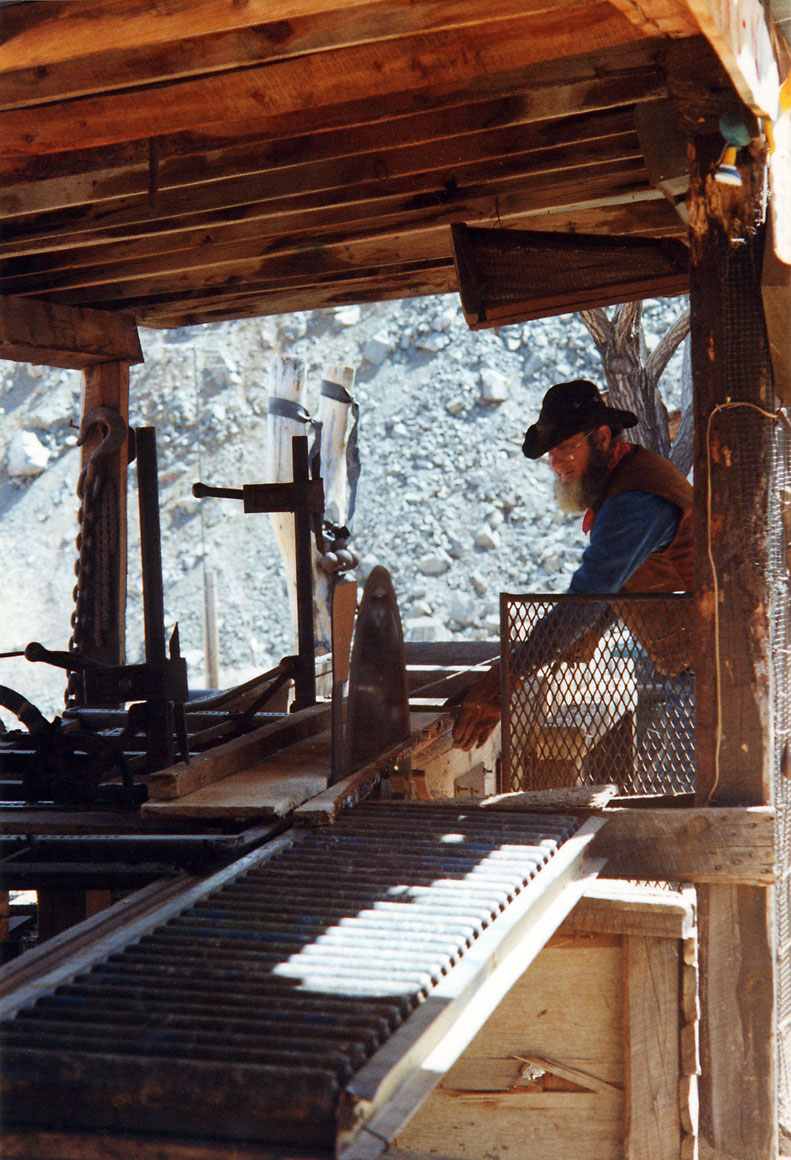
Early 20th-century sawmill, maintained at Jerome, Arizona

A sawmill (saw mill, saw-mill) or lumber mill describes either a facility where logs are cut into lumber, or the machine that mills the logs in such a facility. Modern sawmills use a motorized saw powered by either electricity or an internal combustion engine to cut logs lengthwise to make long pieces known as flitches, and crosswise to length depending on standard or custom sizes (dimensional lumber). The "portable" sawmill is a mobile version that is less complicated to operate, for a single sawyer. The log lies flat on a steel bed, and the motorized saw cuts the log horizontally along the length of the bed, either driven by a separate motor or by the operator manually pushing the saw. The most basic kind of sawmill consists of a chainsaw and a customized jig ("Alaskan sawmill"), with similar horizontal operation. The chainsaws used in these mills cut with a ripping chain ground to cut along the length of the log as opposed to across the diameter of the log.

Before the invention of the sawmill, boards were made in various manual ways, either rived (split) and planed, hewn, or more often hand sawn by two men with a whipsaw, one above and another in a saw pit below. The earliest known mechanical mill is the Hierapolis sawmill, a Roman water-powered stone mill at Hierapolis, Asia Minor dating back to the 3rd century AD. Other water-powered mills followed and by the 11th century they were widespread in Spain and North Africa, the Middle East and Central Asia, and in the next few centuries, spread across Europe. The circular motion of the wheel was converted to a reciprocating motion at the saw blade. Generally, only the saw was powered, and the logs had to be loaded and moved by hand. An early improvement was the development of a movable carriage, also water powered, to move the log steadily through the saw blade.

By the time of the Industrial Revolution in the 18th century, the circular saw blade had been invented, and with the development of steam power in the 19th century, a much greater degree of mechanization was possible. Scrap lumber from the mill provided a source of fuel for firing the boiler. The arrival of railroads meant that logs could be transported to mills rather than mills being built beside navigable waterways. By 1900, the largest sawmill in the world was operated by the Atlantic Coast Lumber Company in Georgetown, South Carolina, using logs floated down the Pee Dee River from the Appalachian Mountains. In the 20th century the introduction of electricity and high technology furthered this process, and now most sawmills are massive and expensive facilities in which most aspects of the work are computerized. Besides the sawn timber, use is made of all the by-products including sawdust, bark, woodchips, and wood pellets, creating a diverse offering of forest products.

== Sawmill process ==
A combustion engine drives a selfmade sawmill in north Florida. Stereo recording 1988

A sawmill's basic operation is much like those of hundreds of years ago: a log enters on one end and dimensional lumber exits on the other end.

- After trees are selected for harvest, the next step in logging is felling the trees, and bucking them to length.
- Branches are cut off the trunk. This is known as limbing.
- Logs are taken by logging truck, rail or a log drive to the sawmill.
- Logs are scaled either on the way to the mill or upon arrival at the mill.
- Debarking removes bark from the logs.
- Decking is the process for sorting the logs by species, size and end use (lumber, plywood, chips).
- A sawyer uses a head saw (also called head rig or primary saw) to break the log into cants (unfinished logs to be further processed) and flitches (unfinished planks).
- Depending upon the species and quality of the log, the cants will either be further broken down by a resaw or a gang edger into multiple flitches and/or boards.
- Edging will take the flitch and trim off all irregular edges leaving four-sided lumber.
- Trimming squares the ends at typical lumber lengths.
- Drying removes naturally occurring moisture from the lumber. This can be done with kilns or air-dried.
- Planing smooths the surface of the lumber leaving a uniform width and thickness.
- Shipping transports the finished lumber to market.

== History ==
=== Antiquity ===
Scheme of the water-driven sawmill at Hierapolis, Asia Minor. The 3rd-century mill incorporated a crank and connecting rod mechanism.

The Hierapolis sawmill, a water-powered stone sawmill at Hierapolis, Asia Minor (modern-day Turkey, then part of the Roman Empire), dating to the second half of the 3rd century, is the earliest known sawmill. It also incorporates a crank and connecting rod mechanism.

Water-powered stone sawmills working with cranks and connecting rods, but without gear train, are archaeologically attested for the 6th century at the Byzantine cities Gerasa (in modern Jordan) and Ephesus (in Asia Minor).

The earliest literary reference to a working sawmill comes from a Roman poet, Ausonius, who wrote a topographical poem about the river Moselle in Germany in the late 4th century AD. At one point in the poem, he describes the shrieking sound of a watermill cutting marble. Marble sawmills also seem to be indicated by the Christian saint Gregory of Nyssa from Anatolia around 370–390 AD, demonstrating a diversified use of water-power in many parts of the Roman Empire.

=== Medieval and early modern era ===
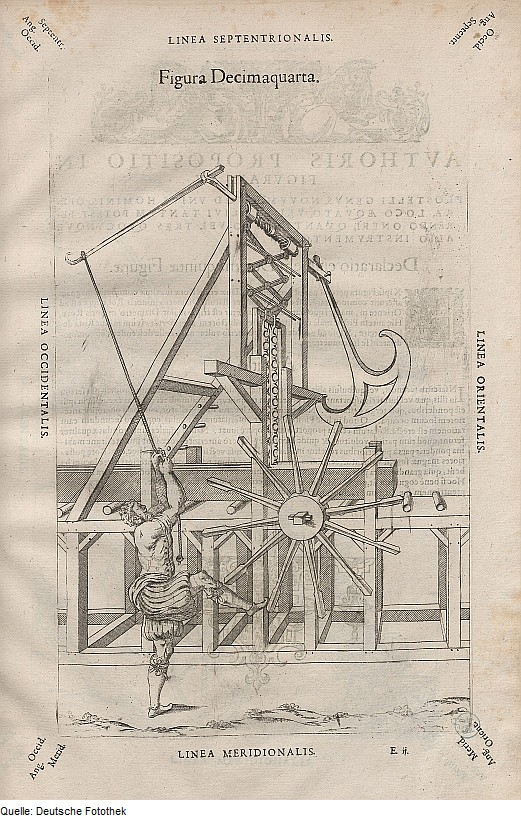
Illustration of a human-powered sawmill with a gang-saw, published in 1582

Timber sawmills are attested in medieval Europe, as one was sketched by Villard de Honnecourt in c. 1225–1235. Sawmills are claimed to have been introduced to Madeira following its discovery in c. 1420 and spread widely in Europe by the 16th century.

In Norway, the first water-powered sawmills appeared in the late 1400s in southern Norway and around the Oslofjord, and during the 16th century the gate saw became common in Norwegian sawmilling.

Working hydraulic sawmills are also documented in late medieval northern Italy.

Prior to the adoption of the timber sawmill, boards were rived (split) and planed, or more often sawn by two men with a whipsaw, using saddleblocks to hold the log, and a saw pit for the pitman who worked below. Sawing was slow, and required strong and hearty men. The topsawer had to be the stronger of the two because the saw was pulled in turn by each man, and the lower had the advantage of gravity. The topsawyer also had to guide the saw so that the board was of even thickness. This was often done by following a chalkline.

Early sawmills adapted the whipsaw to mechanical power, generally driven by a water wheel to speed up the process. The circular motion of the wheel was changed to back-and-forth motion of the saw blade by a connecting rod known as a pitman arm (thus introducing a term used in many mechanical applications). Such mills are referred to as sashmills.

A key problem in the development of water-powered sawmills was not merely driving the saw blade, but feeding the timber into it mechanically and reliably. Early designs, such as Villard de Honnecourt's water-driven saw, already included an automatic feed keeping the log pressed against the saw. Renaissance engineers later drew increasingly elaborate sawmill mechanisms: Francesco di Giorgio Martini designed a waterwheel-powered saw in which a crank-driven frame moved the blade while a ratchet advanced the trunk-bearing carriage, and Leonardo da Vinci drew a sawmill in which the same water-powered mechanism moved both the saw and the cart carrying the log.

A type of sawmill without a crank is known from Germany called "knock and drop" or simply "drop" -mills. In these drop sawmills, the frame carrying the saw blade is knocked upwards by cams as the shaft turns. These cams are let into the shaft on which the waterwheel sits. When the frame carrying the saw blade is in the topmost position it drops by its own weight, making a loud knocking noise, and in so doing it cuts the trunk.

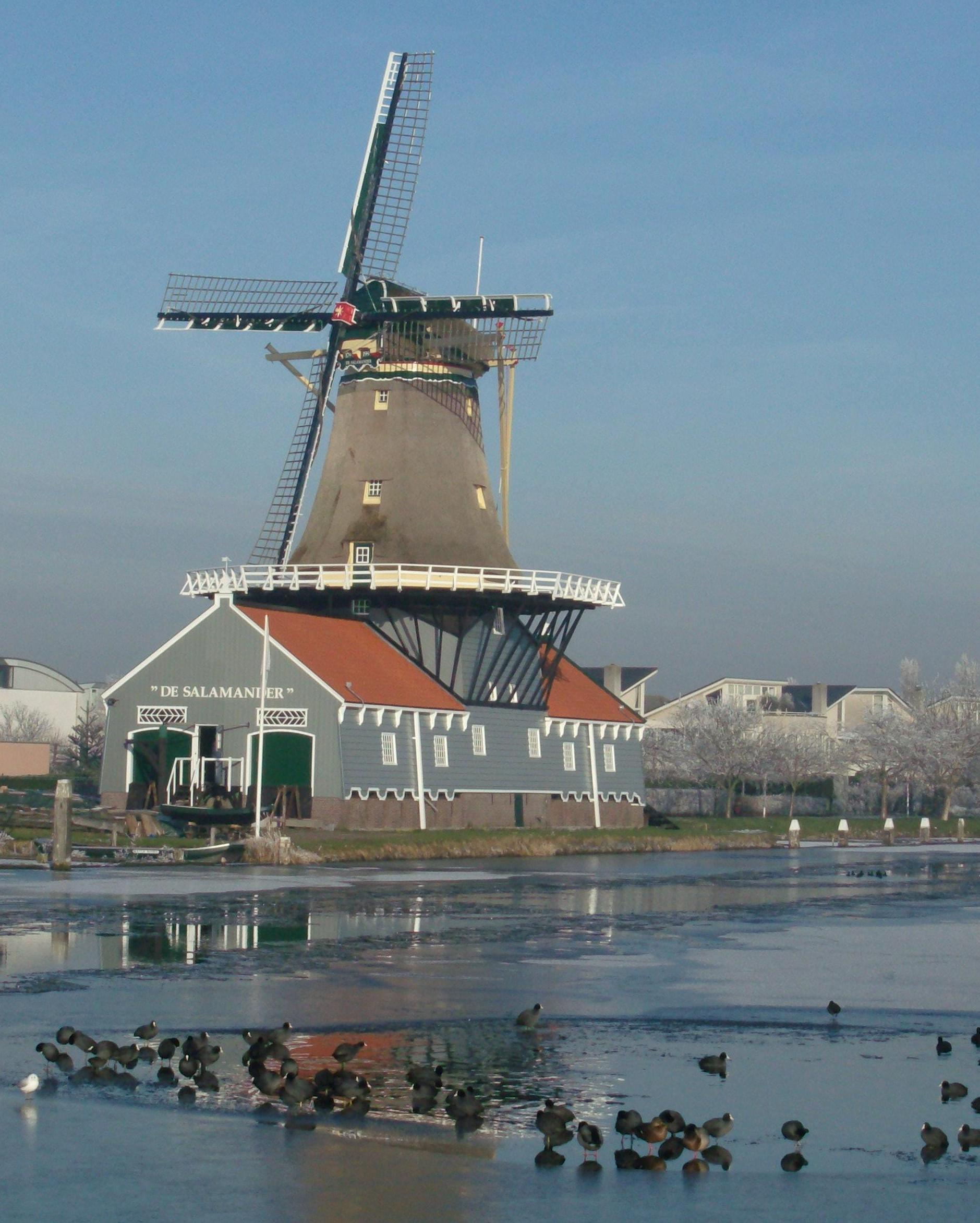
"De Salamander" a wind driven sawmill in Leidschendam, Netherlands. Built in 1792, it was used until 1953, when it fell into disrepair. It was fully restored in 1989.

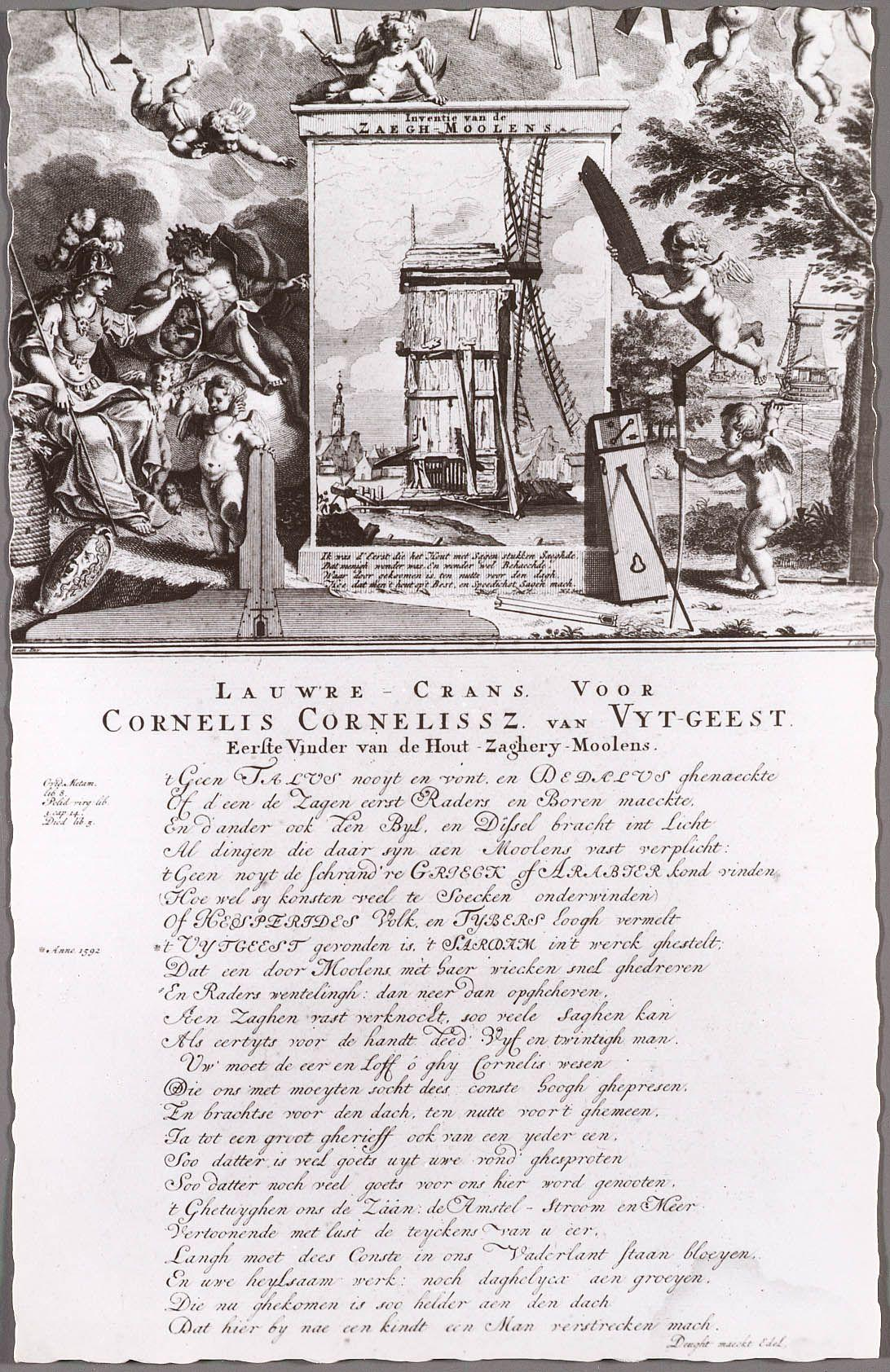
18th-century allegorical print commemorating C.C. van Uitgeest's saw mill

The Dutch windmill owner Cornelis Corneliszoon van Uitgeest invented in 1594 the wind-powered sawmill, which made the conversion of log timber into planks 30 times faster than before. His wind-powered sawmill used a crankshaft to convert a windmill's circular motion into a back-and-forward motion powering the saw, and was granted a patent for the technique. Wind-powered sawmills spread rapidly in the Dutch Republic, especially in the Zaan district. By 1630 there were 83 sawmills north of Amsterdam, of which 53 were in the Zaan district; the number peaked in 1731 at 450 sawmills, including 256 in the Zaan district. Dutch use of sawmills also extended overseas: Sawmills operated at shipyards in Dutch East India Company settlements, including Onrust Island off Batavia (present-day Jakarta) and Colombo. The technology was important to Dutch shipbuilding: One study notes that wind-powered sawmills could process 60 beams in four to five days, compared with 120 days by hand, helping Dutch shipyards produce large numbers of ocean-going ships in the 17th century.

Water-powered stone sawmills reappear in early modern Europe: The Fallen Mill at El Escorial, built at the end of the 16th century in Spain, included a marble sawmill used for the monastery's basilica.

By 1627, sawmills appear in China during the Ming-Qing transition.

In English North America, the sawmill was introduced soon after the colonisation of Virginia by recruiting skilled men from Hamburg. Later the metal parts were obtained from the Netherlands, where the technology was far ahead of that in England. The arrival of a sawmill was a large and stimulative step in the growth of a frontier community. In New England, the first water-powered sawmills were built near Berwick, Maine, in the 1630s. In 17th-century Massachusetts, water-powered sawmills became widespread because timber was abundant, streams were numerous, and skilled labour was expensive; by 1700 virtually every township in Massachusetts had at least one sawmill.

In Ireland, William Colles developed a water-powered sawmill for working Kilkenny marble in the 1730s. A 1732 account described ten water-driven saws at his works on the River Nore, and later descriptions credited his machinery with sawing, boring, and polishing marble more cheaply than hand methods.

Despite their growing popularity, powered sawmills remained rare in England until the later 18th century. This delay is attributed to opposition from sawyers, a widespread but erroneous belief that sawmills were illegal, and weak commercial incentives, since large English consumers often imported timber already sawn by Baltic, Norwegian, and Dutch mills. In Scotland and the North American colonies, where timber was plentiful and labor was comparatively scarce, sawmills were already in use by the mid-17th century. In England, the Society for the Encouragement of Arts, Manufactures and Commerce offered premiums for sawmills in 1759; James Stansfield won the premium in 1760 by converting a fulling mill into a sawmill, and Charles Dingley built a Dutch-style wind-powered sawmill at Limehouse in 1767. Dingley's mill was attacked by sawyers in 1768, after which Parliament compensated him and made damage to sawmills and other industrial engines a felony.

By 1783, The Royal Society of the Arts declared that sawmills were "firmly established in England".

=== Industrial Revolution ===
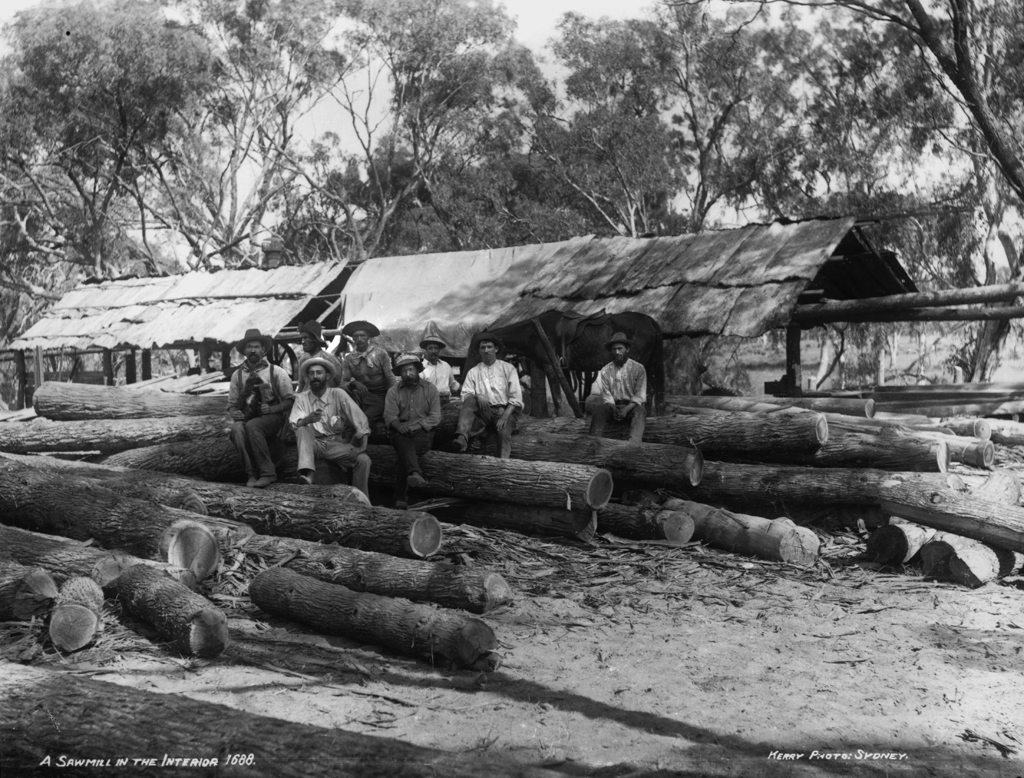
A sawmill in the interior of Australia, c. 1900

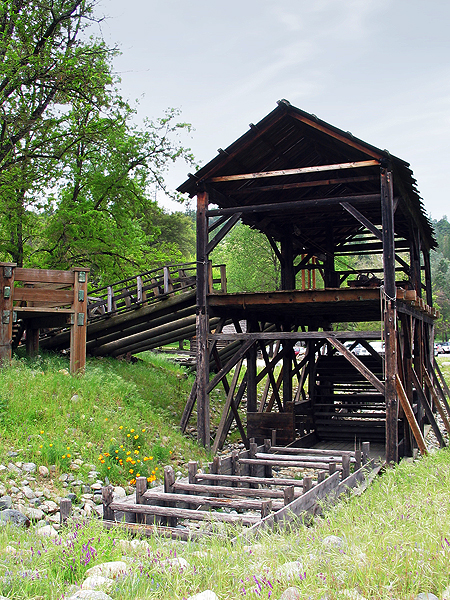
Modern reconstruction Sutter's Mill in California, where gold was first found in 1848

Early mills had been taken to the forest, where a temporary shelter was built, and the logs were skidded to the nearby mill by horse or ox teams, often when there was some snow to provide lubrication. As mills grew larger, they were usually established in more permanent facilities on a river, and the logs were floated down to them by log drivers. Sawmills built on navigable rivers, lakes, or estuaries were called cargo mills because of the availability of ships transporting cargoes of logs to the sawmill and cargoes of lumber from the sawmill.

The next major improvement was the use of circular saw blades, perhaps invented in England in the late 18th century, or perhaps earlier in 17th-century Netherlands. Soon thereafter, millers used gangsaws, which added additional blades so that a log would be reduced to boards in one quick step. Circular saw blades were extremely expensive and highly subject to damage by overheating or dirty logs. A new kind of technician arose, the sawfiler. Sawfilers were highly skilled in metalworking. Their main job was to set and sharpen teeth. The craft also involved learning how to hammer a saw, whereby a saw is deformed with a hammer and anvil to counteract the forces of heat and cutting. Modern circular saw blades have replaceable teeth, but still need to be hammered.

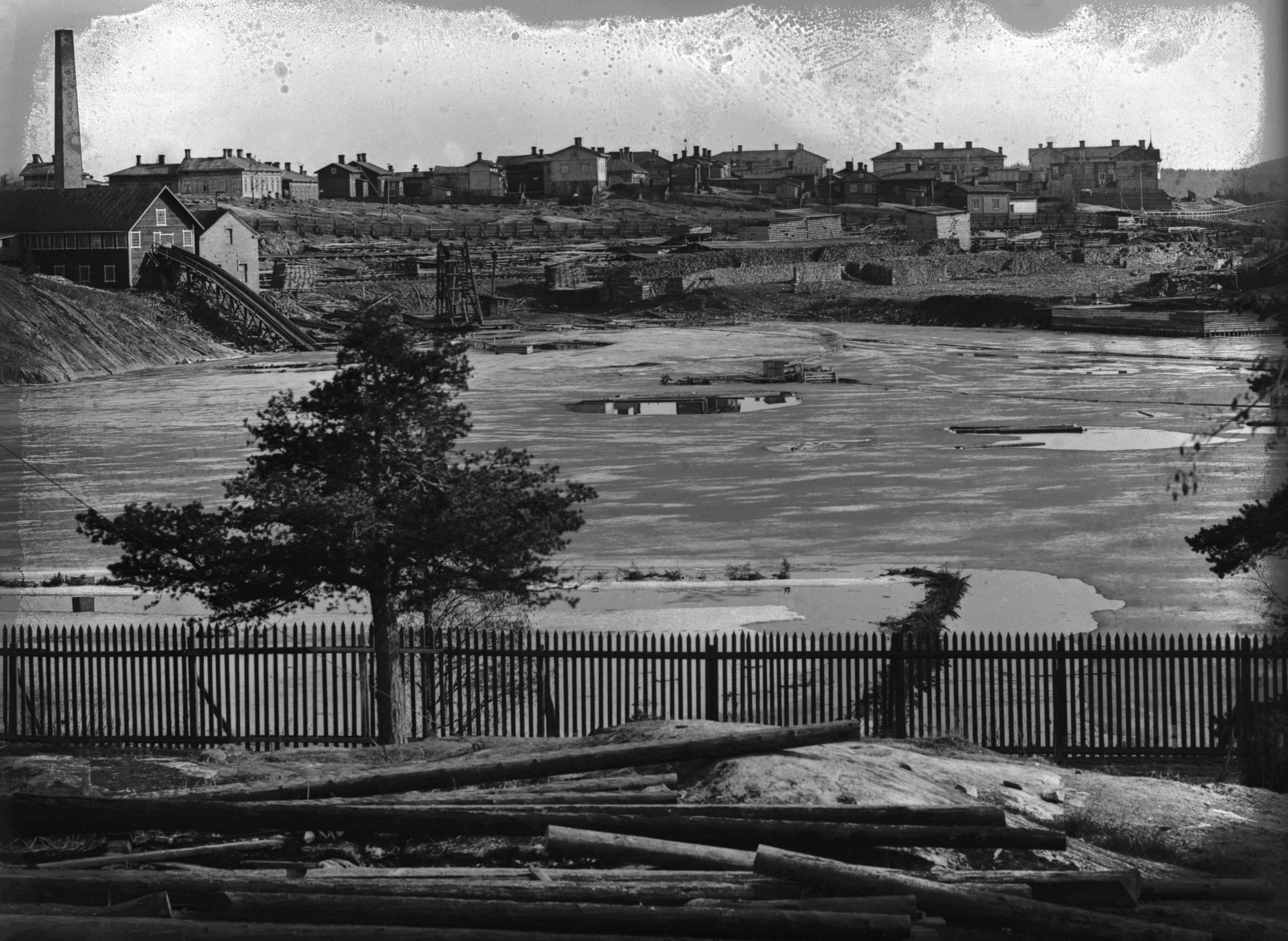
A sawmill of Naistenlahti in Tampere, Finland, 1890s

The introduction of steam power in the late 18th and early 19th centuries opened many new possibilities for sawmills. An early, unsuccessful steam-powered sawmill project was undertaken for the Spanish naval arsenal at La Carraca near Cádiz in 1792, using a Watt engine.

Availability of railroad transportation for logs and lumber later encouraged building of rail mills away from navigable water. Steam-powered sawmills could be far more mechanized, and scrap lumber from the mill provided a ready fuel source for firing the boiler. Efficiency was increased, but the capital cost of a new mill increased dramatically as well.

In Britain, Marc Isambard Brunel designed a sophisticated steam-powered sawmill for Chatham Dockyard; constructed in 1812–1814. Brunel's machinery operated eight timber-cutting frames, each capable of holding up to 36 saws, and staffed by as few as two attendants.

The bandsaw was another important development. William Newberry patented an endless band-saw in Britain in 1808, but early bandsaws remained impractical because of the difficulty of making a durable flexible blade. Later improvements in blade welding, metallurgy, blade guides, and tensioning by the Paris firm Périn & Cie made the bandsaw commercially practical by the 1860s. Bandsaws became important in sawmilling because their narrower kerf wasted less wood than large circular saws and allowed very large logs to be cut more efficiently.

In addition, the use of steam or gasoline-powered traction engines also allowed the entire sawmill to be mobile.

By 1900, the largest sawmill in the world was operated by the Atlantic Lumber Company in Georgetown, South Carolina, using logs floated down the Pee Dee River from as far as the edge of the Appalachian Mountains in North Carolina.

A restoration project for Sturgeon's Mill in Northern California is underway, restoring one of the last steam-powered lumber mills still using its original equipment.

== Current trends ==
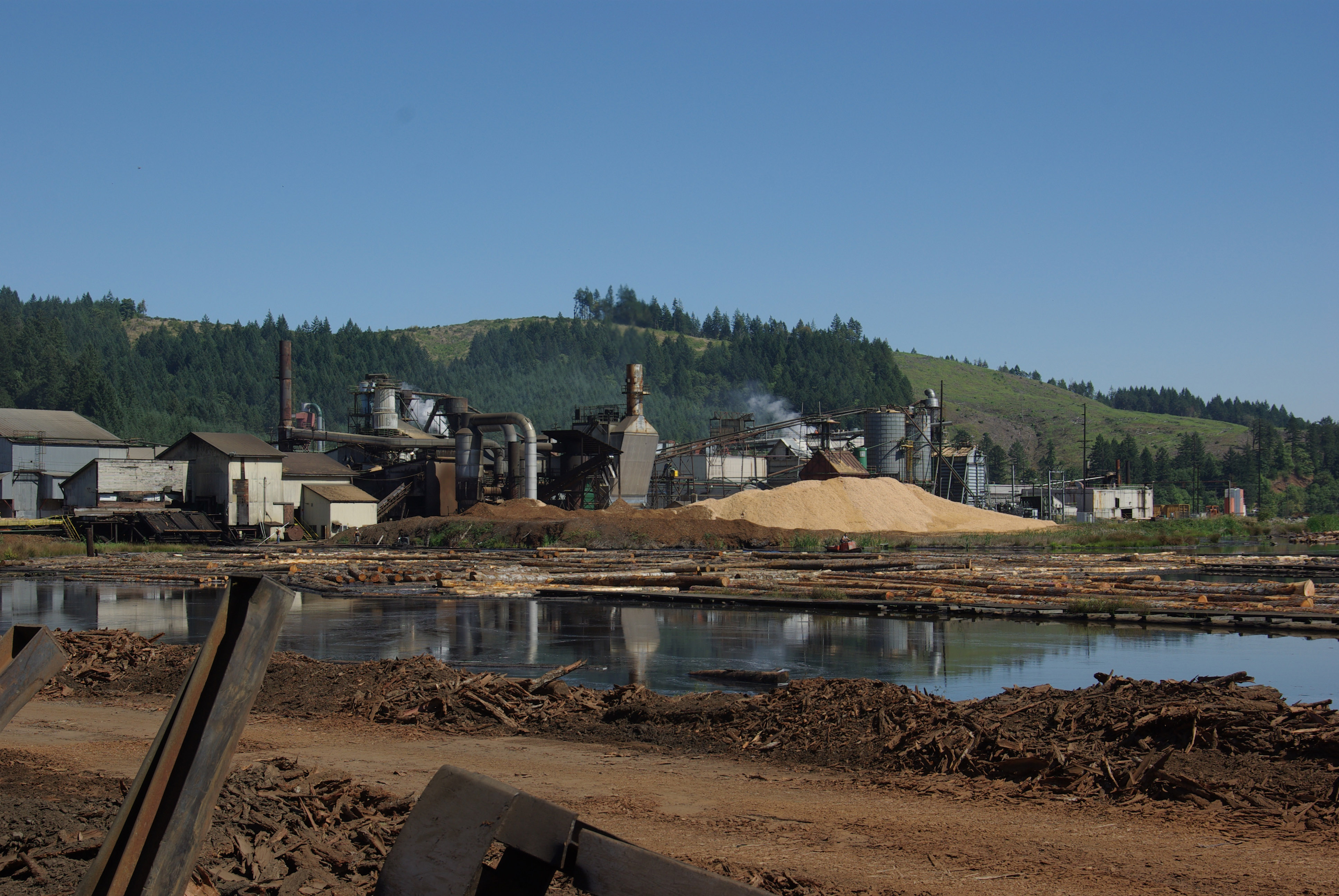
Oregon Mill using energy efficient ponding to move logs

In the twentieth century the introduction of electricity and high technology furthered this process, and now most sawmills are massive and expensive facilities in which most aspects of the work is computerized. The cost of a new facility with 4,700-cubic-metre-per-day (2-million-board-foot-per-day) capacity is up to CAN$120,000,000. A modern operation will produce between 240,000 to 1,650,000 cubic metres (100 to 700 million board feet) annually.

Small gasoline or electricity powered sawmills run by local entrepreneurs served many communities in the early twentieth century, and specialty markets still today.

A trend is the small portable sawmill for personal or even professional use. Many different models have emerged with different designs and functions. They are especially suitable for producing limited volumes of boards, or specialty milling such as oversized timber. Portable sawmills have gained popularity for the convenience of bringing the sawmill to the logs and milling lumber in remote locations. Some remote communities that have experienced natural disasters have used portable sawmills to rebuild their communities out of the fallen trees, such as when Hurricane Helene devastated south-east United States in 2024, and communities of volunteers used their portable sawmills to aid reconstruction.

Technology has changed sawmill operations significantly in recent years, emphasizing increasing profits through waste minimization and increased energy efficiency as well as improving operator safety. The once-ubiquitous rusty, steel conical sawdust burners have for the most part vanished, as the sawdust and other mill waste is now processed into particleboard and related products, or used to heat wood-drying kilns. Co-generation facilities will produce power for the operation and may also feed superfluous energy onto the grid. While the bark may be ground for landscaping barkdust, it may also be burned for heat. Sawdust may make particle board or be pressed into wood pellets for pellet stoves. The larger pieces of wood that will not make lumber are chipped into wood chips and provide a source of supply for paper mills. Wood by-products of the mills will also make oriented strand board (OSB) paneling for building construction, a cheaper and in some use cases more robust alternative to plywood for paneling. Some automatic mills can process 800 small logs into bark chips, wood chips, sawdust and sorted, stacked, and bound planks, in an hour.

== See also ==
- Band saw
- Circular saw
- Hewing
- Log bucking
- Logging
- Lumber yard
- Saw pit
- Sawfiler
- Wood drying
- Paper mill

== Sources ==
- Grewe, Klaus (2009), "Die Reliefdarstellung einer antiken Steinsägemaschine aus Hierapolis in Phrygien und ihre Bedeutung für die Technikgeschichte. Internationale Konferenz 13.−16. Juni 2007 in Istanbul", in Bachmann, Martin (ed.), Bautechnik im antiken und vorantiken Kleinasien (PDF), Byzas, vol. 9, Istanbul: Ege Yayınları/Zero Prod. Ltd., pp. 429–454, ISBN 978-975-8072-23-1, archived from the original (PDF) on 2011-05-11
- Ritti, Tullia; Grewe, Klaus; Kessener, Paul (2007), "A Relief of a Water-powered Stone Saw Mill on a Sarcophagus at Hierapolis and its Implications", Journal of Roman Archaeology, vol. 20, pp. 138–163, doi:10.1017/S1047759400005341
- Oakleaf, H.B. (1920), Lumber Manufacture in the Douglas Fir Region, Chicago: Commercial Journal Company
- Wilson, Andrew (2002), "Machines, Power and the Ancient Economy", The Journal of Roman Studies, vol. 92, pp. 1–32, doi:10.2307/3184857, JSTOR 3184857
