= Wood grain =

Alignment and texture of the fibres in wood

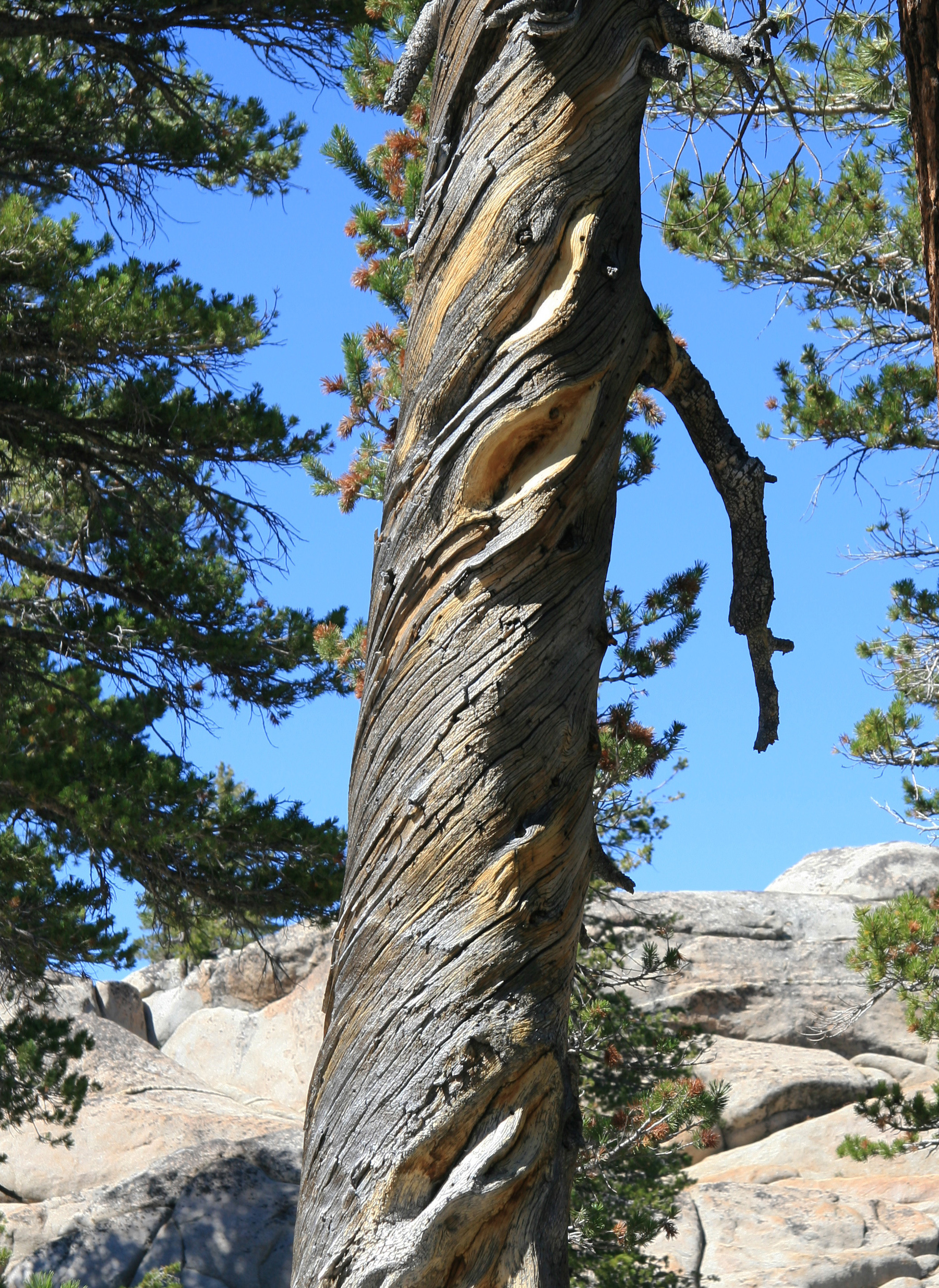
The weathered trunk of a lodgepole pine tree showing an extremely spiral grain

Wood grain is the longitudinal arrangement of wood fibers or the pattern resulting from such an arrangement. It has various derived terms referring to different aspects of the fibers or patterns. Wood grain is important in woodworking and it impacts aesthetics.

== Definition and meanings ==
Wood grain is the longitudinal arrangement of wood fibers or the pattern resulting from such an arrangement. R. Bruce Hoadley wrote that grain is a "confusingly versatile term" with numerous different uses, including the direction of the wood cells (e.g., straight grain, spiral grain), surface appearance or figure, growth-ring placement (e.g., vertical grain), plane of the cut (e.g., end grain), rate of growth (e.g., narrow grain), and relative cell size (e.g., open grain).

== Physical aspects ==
Grain in growing wood follows the grown fibres of the timber and is mostly, but not entirely, longitudinal to the trunk of the tree. This can be influenced in branches, where the effect of gravity on the branch can distort the regularity of timber structure, compared to a vertical trunk. For this reason, branch wood is often not usable, or is of less value.

=== Growing ===
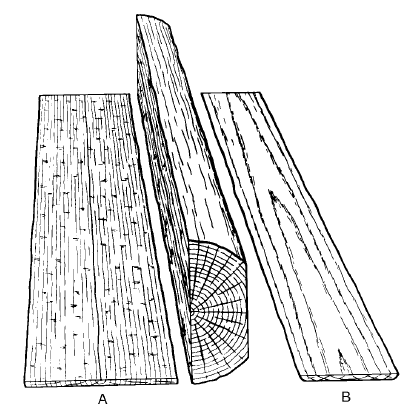
Sketch of A—Quarter-sawn & B—flat-sawn

In describing the alignment of the wood in the tree, a distinction may be made. Different tree species may have one of the following basic grain descriptions and types:

- straight - grain which runs in a single direction, parallel to the axis of the tree.
- spiral - grain which spirals around the axis of the tree.
- interlocked - grain which spirals around the axis of the tree, but reverses its direction for periods of years resulting in alternating directions of the spiral grain. On quartersawn surfaces the change in grain direction creates a ribbon stripe figure.
- wavy - grain which grows in a wavy fashion up the trunk; seen best in flatsawn sections of wood.
- irregular - grain that swirls or twists. It can be found in a number of different patterns. This can be caused by factors such as knots, burls or "crotch" wood - where large branches separate from the trunk.

=== Aesthetic ===
In most timber, the grain of the timber is not the primary aesthetic feature. This is instead the figure of the timber, which is produced by the annual growth rings. In most timber, especially deciduous hardwoods, this is much more visible than the grain.

=== Mechanical strength ===
The two categories of grain in a piece of sawn timber are straight grain or long grain and cross grain or short grain. Straight grain runs parallel to the longitudinal axis of the piece. Cross grain deviates from the longitudinal axis in two ways: spiral grain or diagonal grain. The amount of deviation is called the slope of the grain. Bulk timber is much stronger along the grain, so a finished piece with long grain will be much stronger than one with short grain. Much of joinery is about techniques to manage this and to avoid having pieces with short grain. Furniture, especially chairs, has developed traditional designs to resist breakage by careful orientation of the grain. In shipbuilding, curved construction is often needed and so knees would be chosen when growing, from branches or branch junctions with a trunk, and then these could be incorporated into a design to match their natural curved grain to the curve of the finished component.

== Woodworking ==
An important physical aspect of wood grain in woodworking is the grain direction or slope (e.g., against the grain). In describing the application of a woodworking technique to a given piece of wood, the direction of the technique may be:

- with the grain (easy; giving a clean result)
- against the grain (heavy going; giving a poor result such as chipping or tear-out)
- across the grain (direction of cut is across the grain lines, but the plane of the cut is still aligned with them)
- end grain (at right angles to the grain, for example trimming the end of a plank)

Woods with straight grains are the easiest to work, while woods with interlocked grains are the most difficult.

=== Support ===
Grain alignment must be considered when joining pieces of wood, or designing wooden structures. For example, a stressed span is less likely to fail if tension is applied along the grain, rather than across the grain. Grain direction will also affect the type of warping seen in the finished item.

== Aesthetics ==
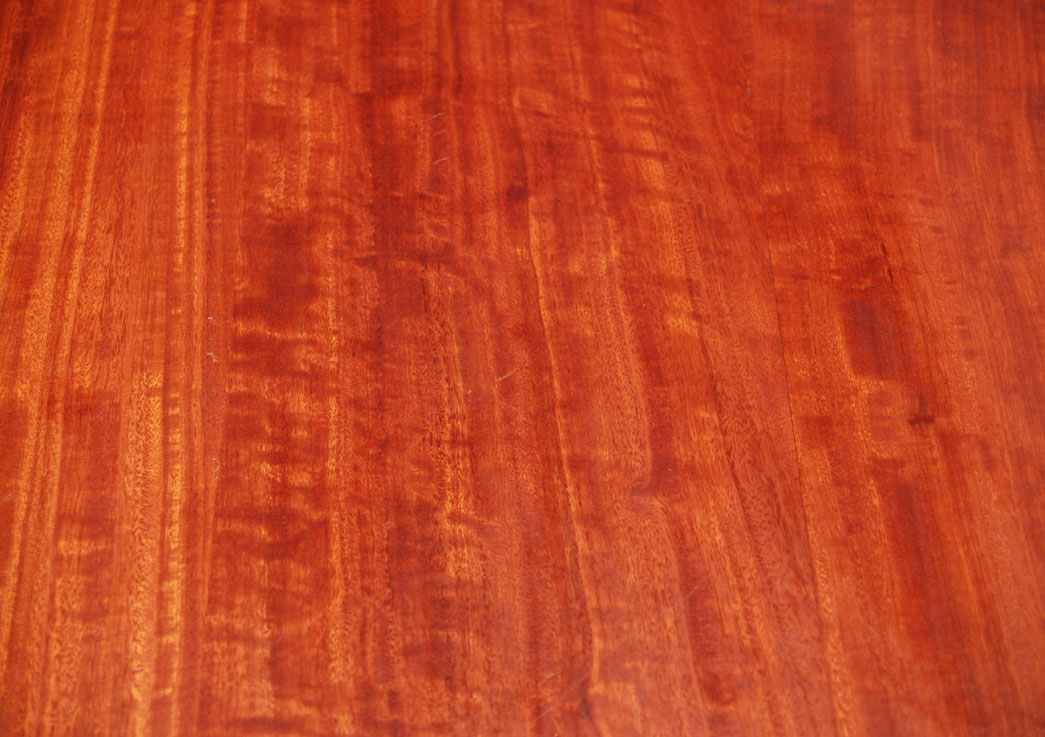
typically figured red gum table

mountain ash floor, showing some fiddleback figure

In its simplest aesthetic meaning, wood grain is the alternating regions of relatively darker and lighter wood resulting from the differing growth parameters occurring in different seasons (i.e., growth rings) on a cut or split piece of wood.

Figure in wood is produced by causes including fungus, burls, stress, knots, and special grain alignments. Strictly speaking, grain is not always the same as the figure of wood. Figure rarity often promotes the value of both the raw material, and the finished work it becomes a part of. These include:

- bird's eye
- quilted
- curly (fiddleback)

The way a given piece of wood has been sawn affects both its appearance and physical properties:

- flat-grain: flat-sawn, slab-sawn, plain sawn, bastard-sawn, or sawn "through and through".
- edge grain: quarter-sawn or rift-sawn or straight-grained, and
- end grain: the grain of wood seen when it is cut across the growth rings.

There is irregular grain in burr wood or burl wood, but this is result of very many knots.

== See also ==
- Grain painting
- Grain filler
- Wood finishing
