= Fiddleback =

Fiddleback may refer to:

- Fiddleback chasuble, a Christian liturgical vestment
- Fiddleback maple, a particular grain of maple wood used for musical instruments
- Fiddleback spider, a colloquial name for the brown recluse spider
