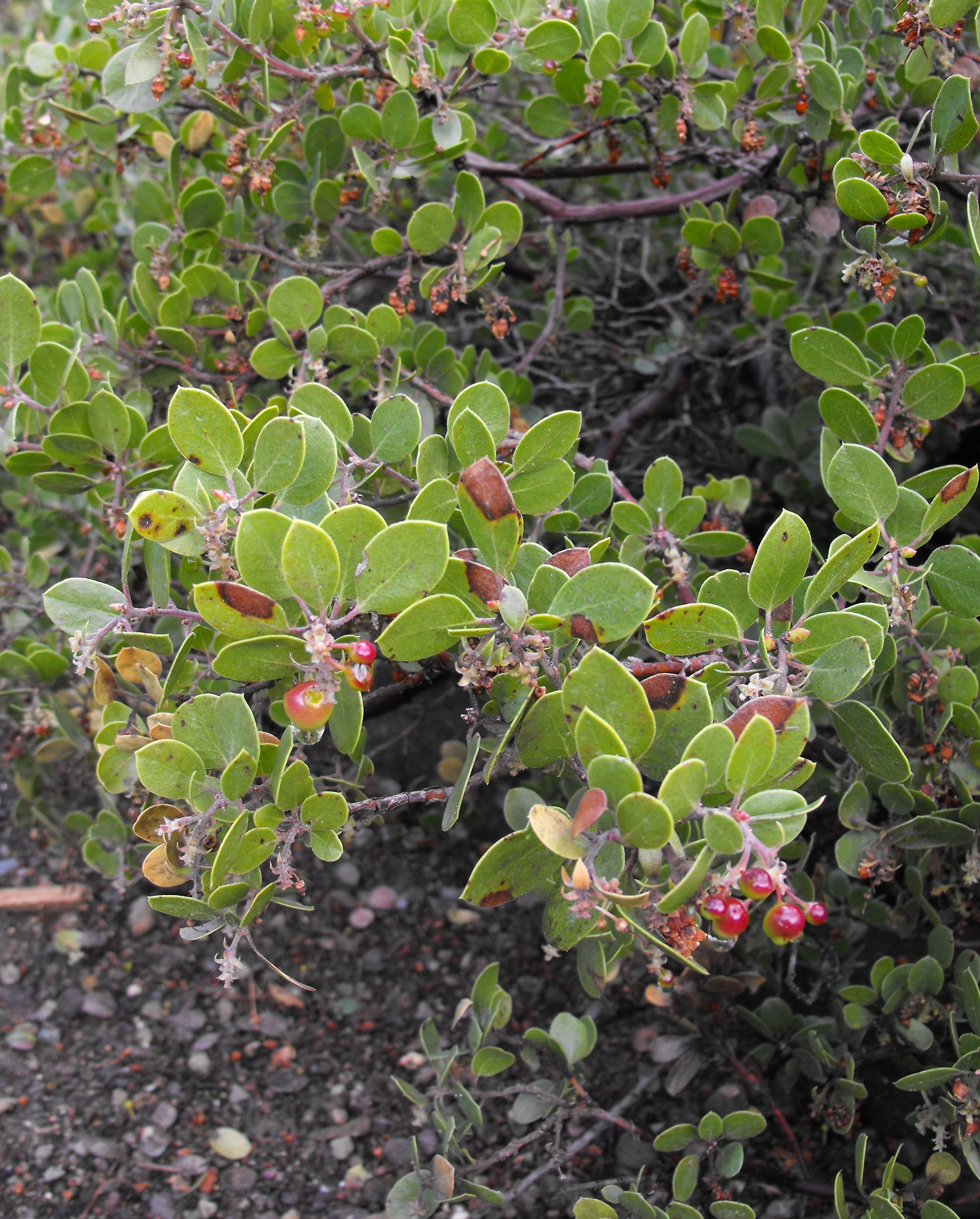

Conservation status
- Imperiled (NatureServe)

Scientific classification
- Kingdom: Plantae
- Clade: Tracheophytes
- Clade: Angiosperms
- Clade: Eudicots
- Clade: Asterids
- Order: Ericales
- Family: Ericaceae
- Genus: Arctostaphylos
- Species: A. rudis

Binomial name
- Arctostaphylos rudis Jeps. & Wies. ex Jeps.

= Arctostaphylos rudis =

Species of flowering plant

Arctostaphylos rudis, with the common names shagbark manzanita and sand mesa manzanita, is a species of manzanita.

== Description ==
This is an erect shrub growing from a burl to heights between one and two meters - 3 and 6 feet. Its stem and branches are covered in shredding gray and reddish bark, with its smaller branches coated in woolly fibers. The leaves are oval in shape and smooth along the edges with few hairs, green in color and shiny. They are 1 to 3 centimeters long. It flowers in late fall and winter in urn-shaped manzanita flowers. The fruits are hairless red drupes about a centimeter wide or slightly larger.

== Distribution ==
Arctostaphylos rudis is endemic to California, where it is known only from the southern Central Coast. It is most abundant at Burton Mesa in the hills north of Lompoc. It grows in chaparral and coastal sage scrub on sandy soils.

== Identification ==
In the wild, A. rudis grows alongside Arctostaphylos purissima. These species can be easily distinguished - rudis has gray, shredding bark and no hairs on new growth, while purrisima has smooth red bark and hairy on new growth. A. rudis is also slightly smaller on average than the latter species.

== Hybrid origin ==
Genetic evidence suggests that shagbark manzanita individuals are hybrids between two species of manzanita from distantly related lineages. The exact parental species are unknown but one is hypothesized to be nipumu manzanita (A. nipumu), which was previously thought to be a Nipomo Mesa population of shagbark manzanita but is now considered a separate species.
