= Quilt maple =

Type of figure in maple wood

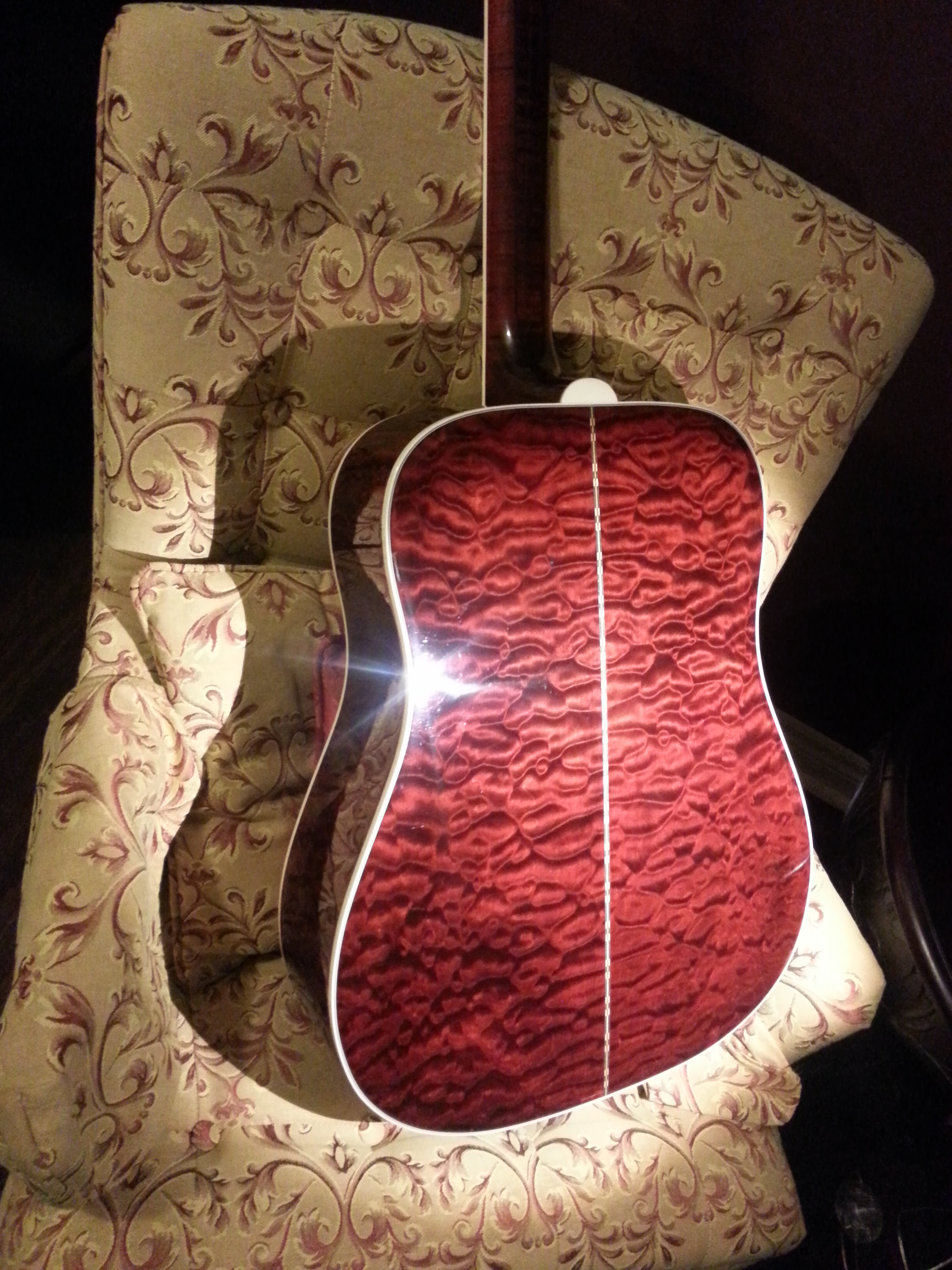
Quilted maple back & side on Gibson Dove 1 of 20

Quilt maple or quilted maple refers to a type of figure in maple wood. It is seen on the tangential plane (flat-sawn) and looks like a wavy "quilted" pattern, often similar to ripples on water. The highest quality quilted figure is found in the Western Big Leaf species of maple. It is a distortion of the grain pattern itself. Prized for its beauty, it is used frequently in the manufacturing of musical instruments, especially guitars.

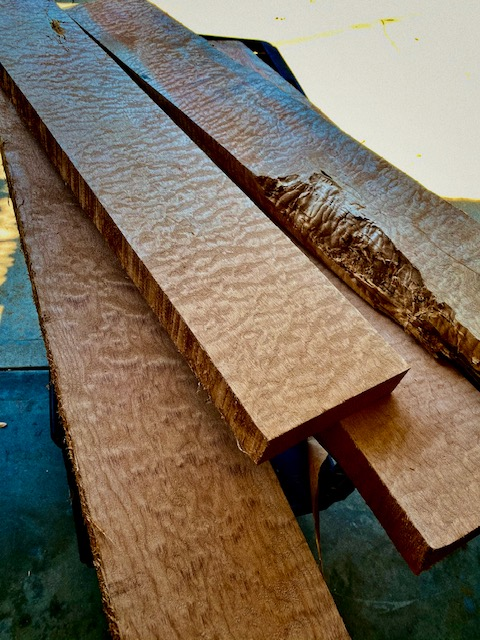
Example of high figure quilt maple wood

== See also ==
- Chatoyancy
- Flame maple
