= Flame maple =

Distortion of wood fibers in maple wood

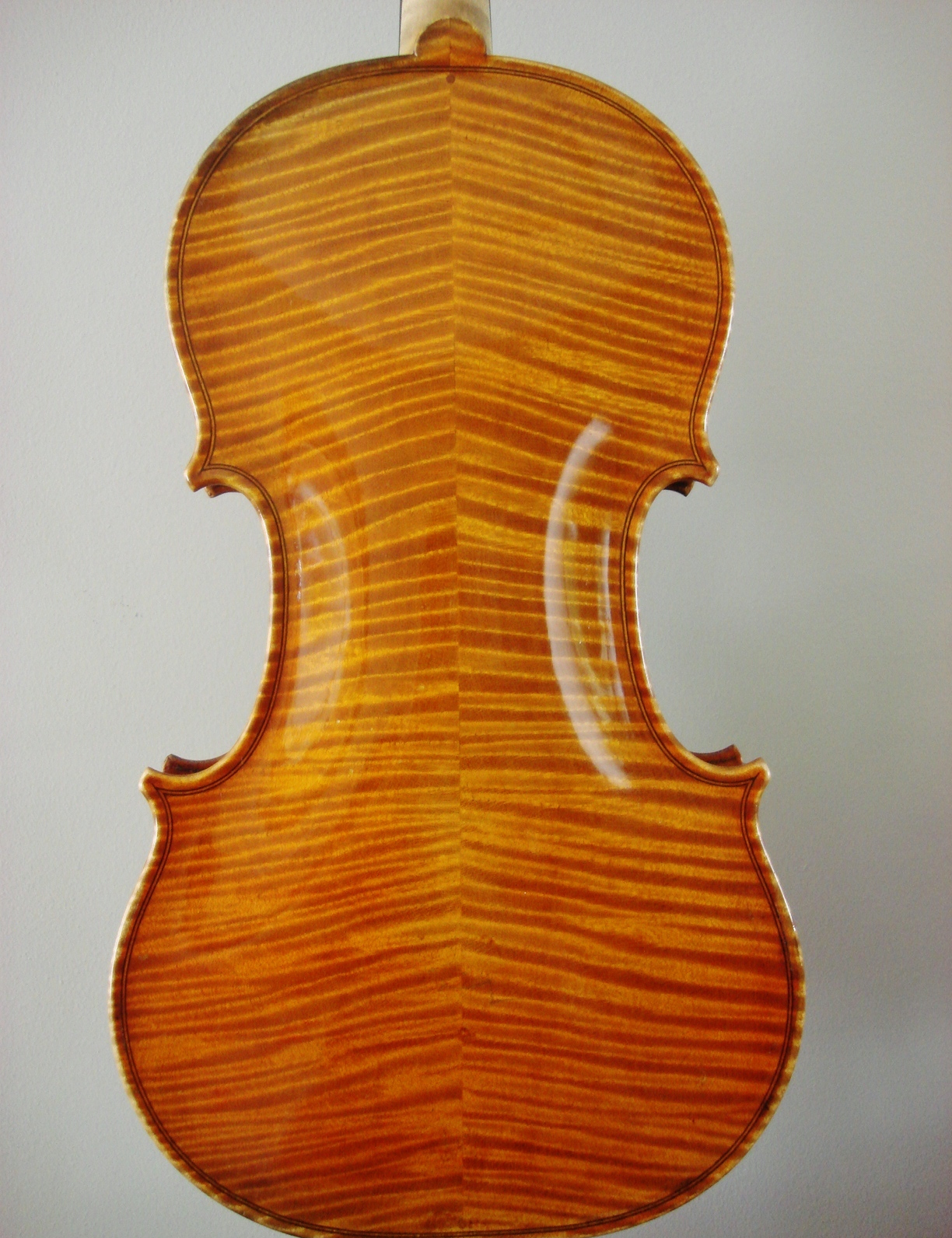
Backside view of a violin

Flame maple (tiger maple), also known as flamed maple, curly maple, ripple maple, fiddleback or tiger stripe, is a feature of maple in which the growth of the wood fibers is distorted in an undulating chatoyant pattern, producing wavy lines known as "flames". This effect is often mistakenly said to be part of the grain of the wood; it is more accurately called "figure", as the distortion is perpendicular to the grain direction. Prized for its beautiful appearance, it is used frequently in the manufacturing of fine furniture and musical instruments, such as violins, guitars, and bassoons.

During the westward expansion of early settlers and explorers into the lands west of the Appalachian Mountains, curly maple was often used for making the stocks used on Kentucky rifles.

== About the wood ==
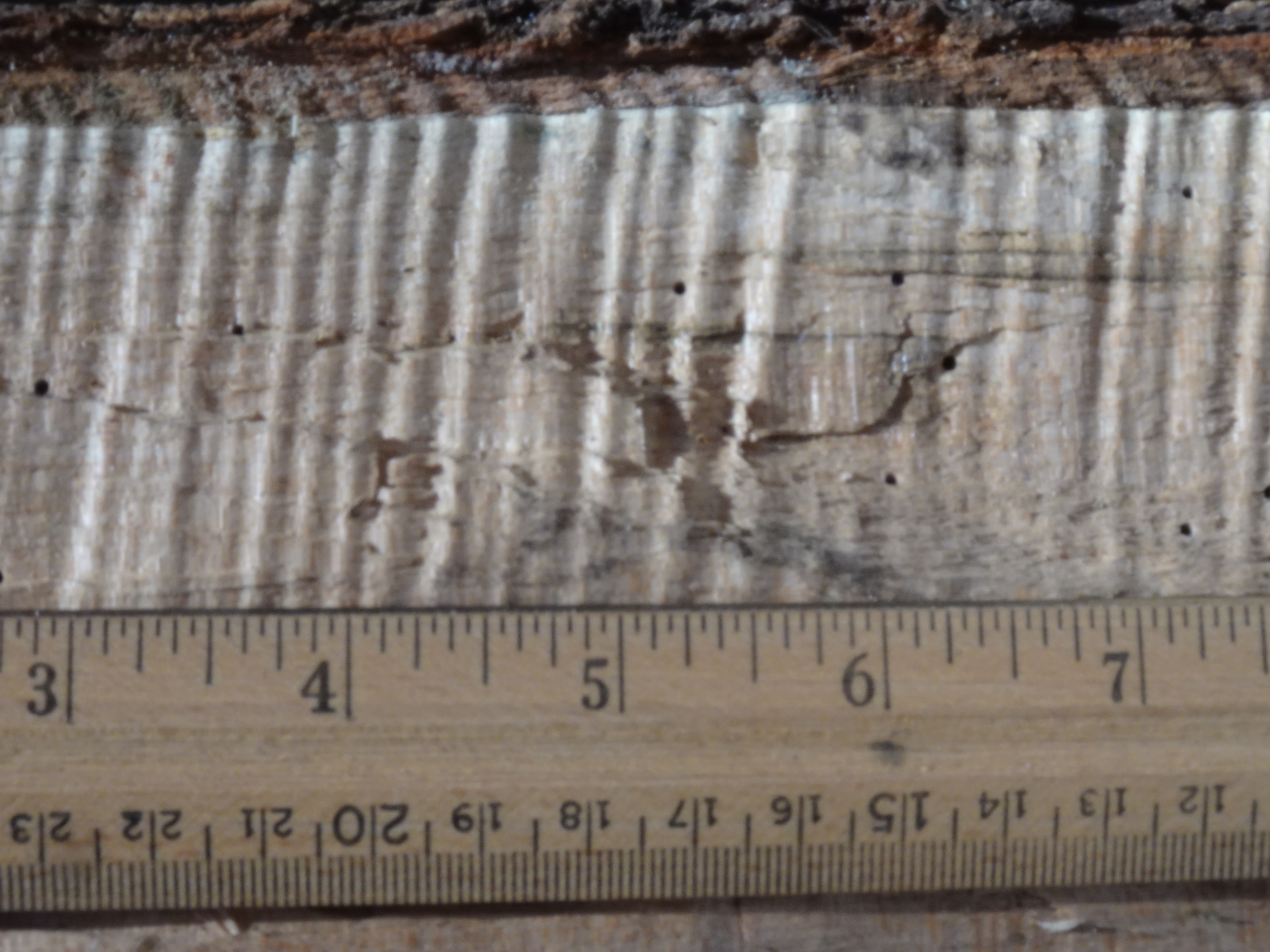
Split tiger maple log shows the physical waviness.

When wood from a tree with undulating grain is split, the wood splits along the undulations, so that the split log shows, and one can feel, the physical waviness.

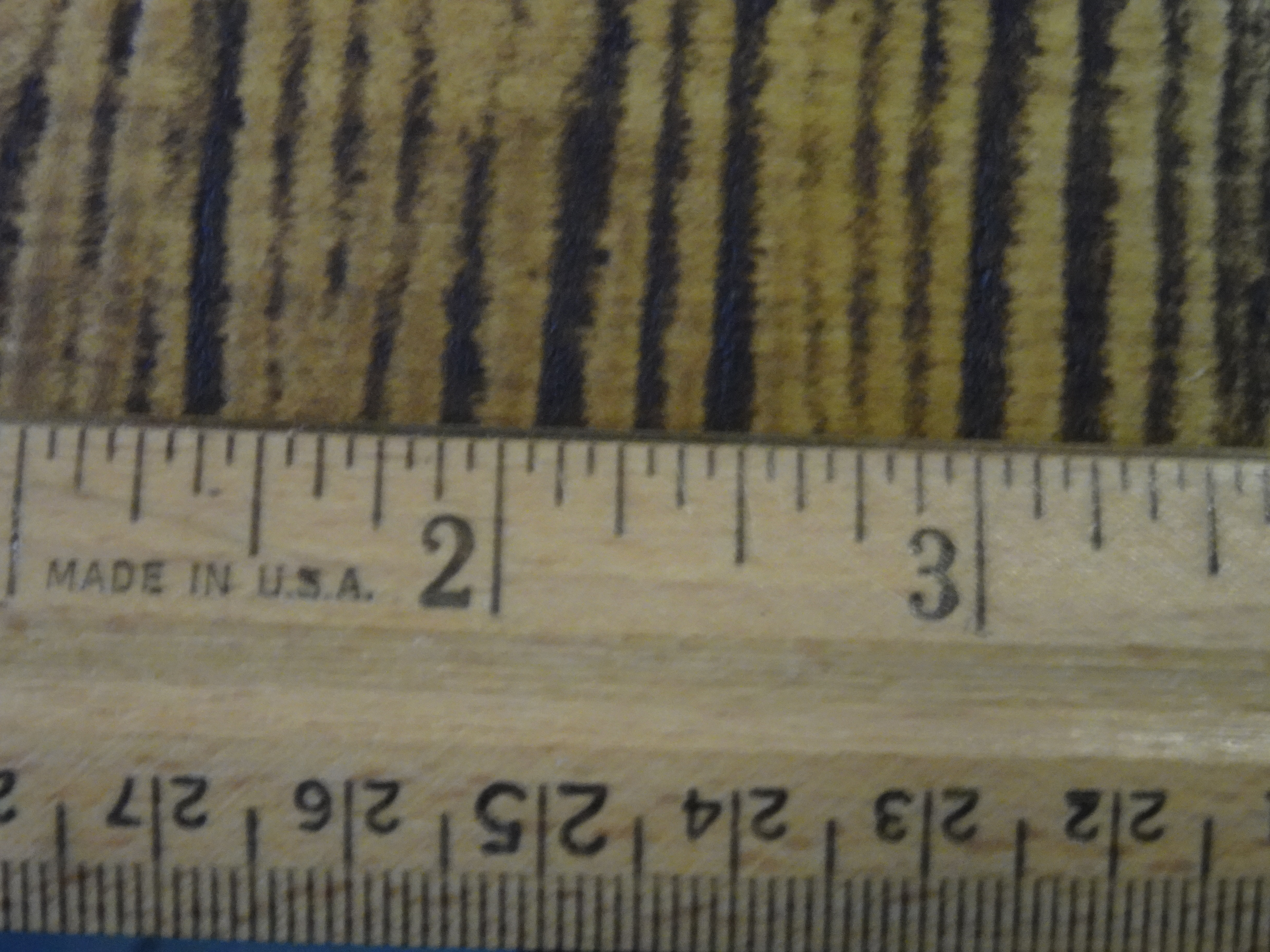
Tiger maple sawn flat and stained. The stain accentuates the alternating flat and end grain of the wood.

When the wood is sawn flat, effectively cutting off the "tops" of the "waves", the result is an alternating pattern of end grain and flat grain. As end grain naturally absorbs more stain than flat grain, staining the sawn wood accentuates the striped pattern.

== Usage in guitars ==
=== Figures on Gibson Les Paul Standard (1958-1960) ===
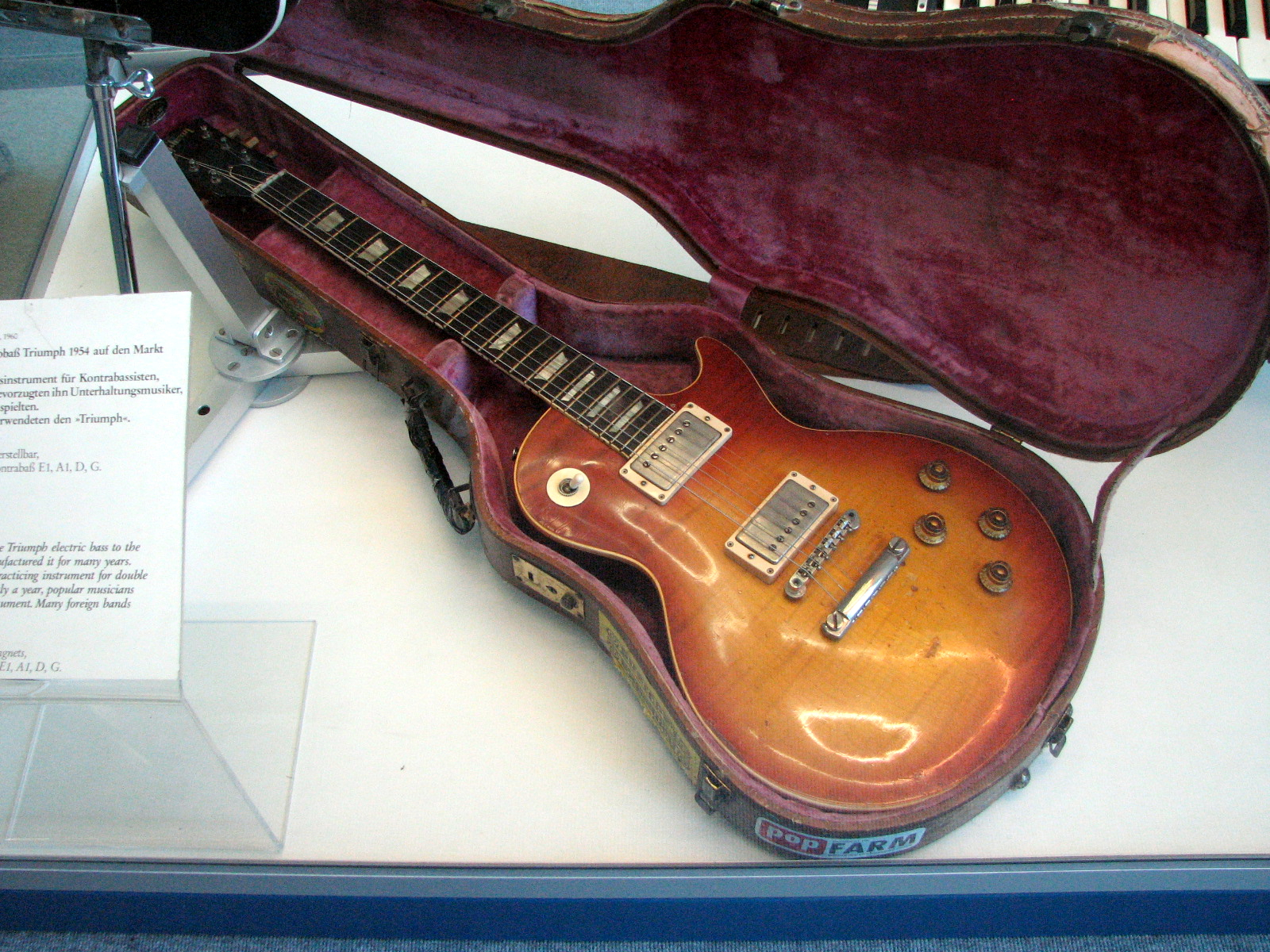
1958 Gibson Les Paul with light flame pattern

According to The Beauty of the 'Burst by Yasuhiko Watanabe, the figures seen on the sunburst Les Paul are categorized into 8 types: 6 types of flame maple (Curly, Ribbon curly, Flame, Tiger stripe, Fiddleback, Pin stripe), and 2 other types (Blister and Bird's eye). Note that usually the last two types are not considered as flame maple variations, along with quilt maple.

=== Figures on modern maple top electric guitars ===
6 types of figure maple wood

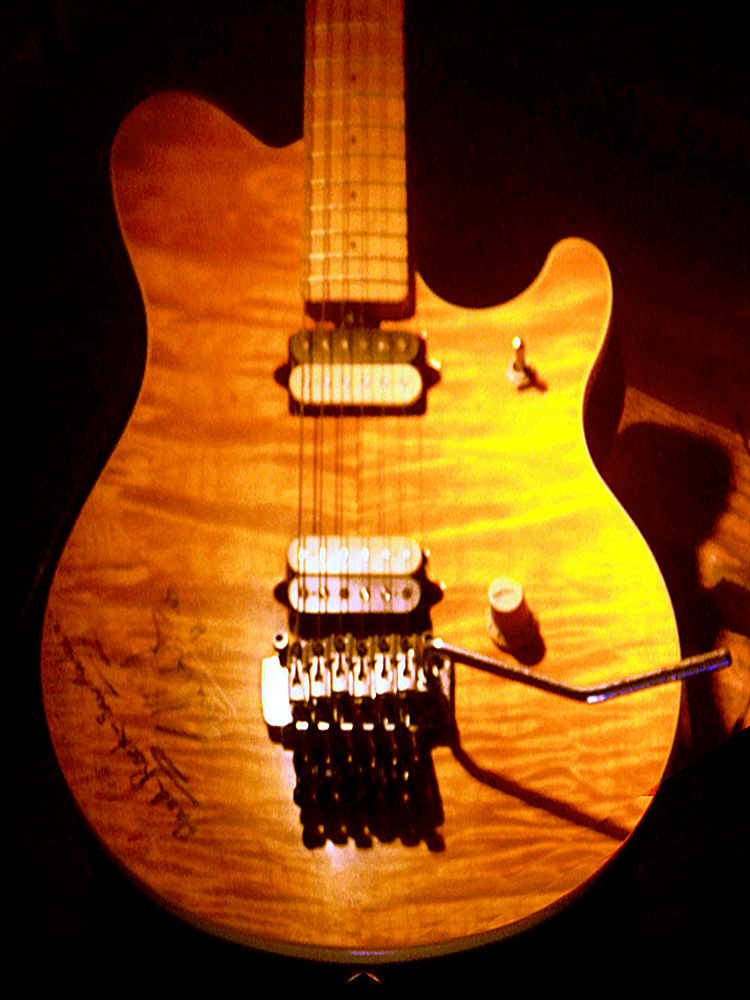
Curly

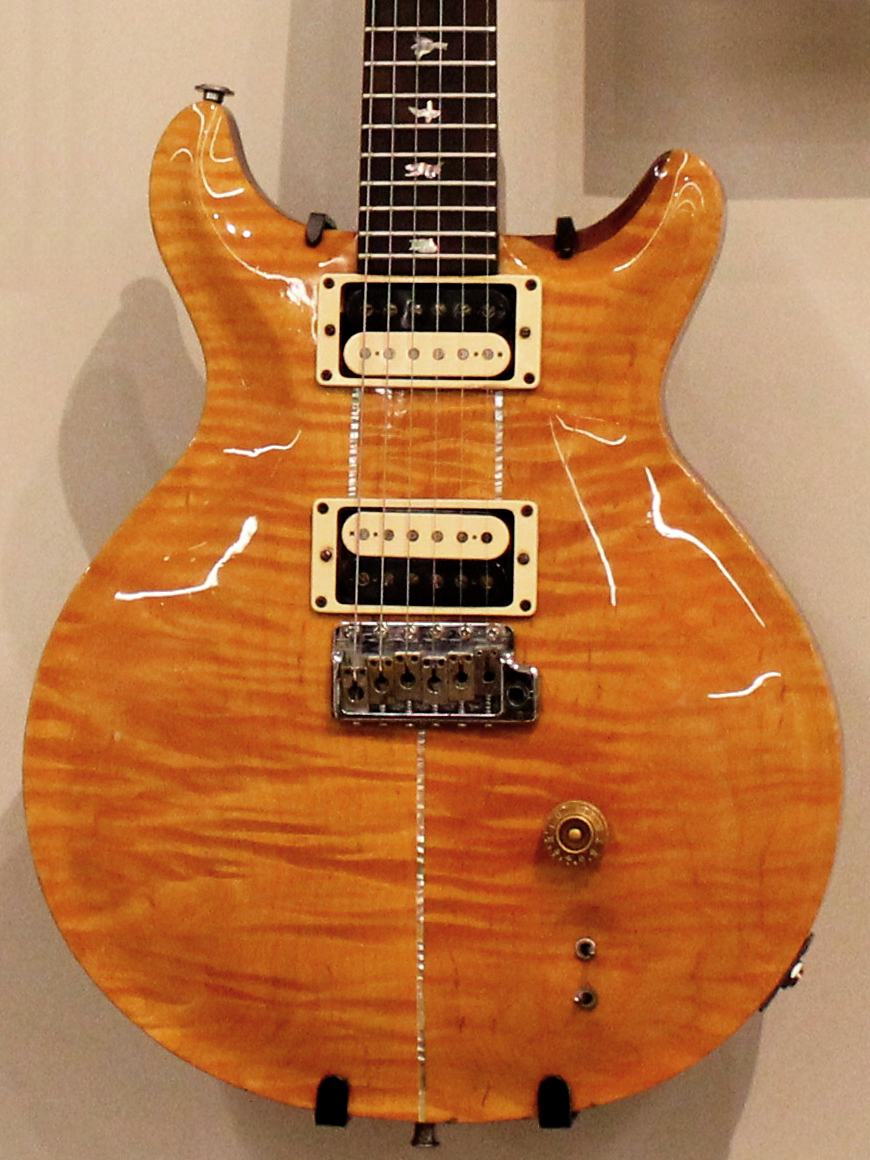
Ribbon curl

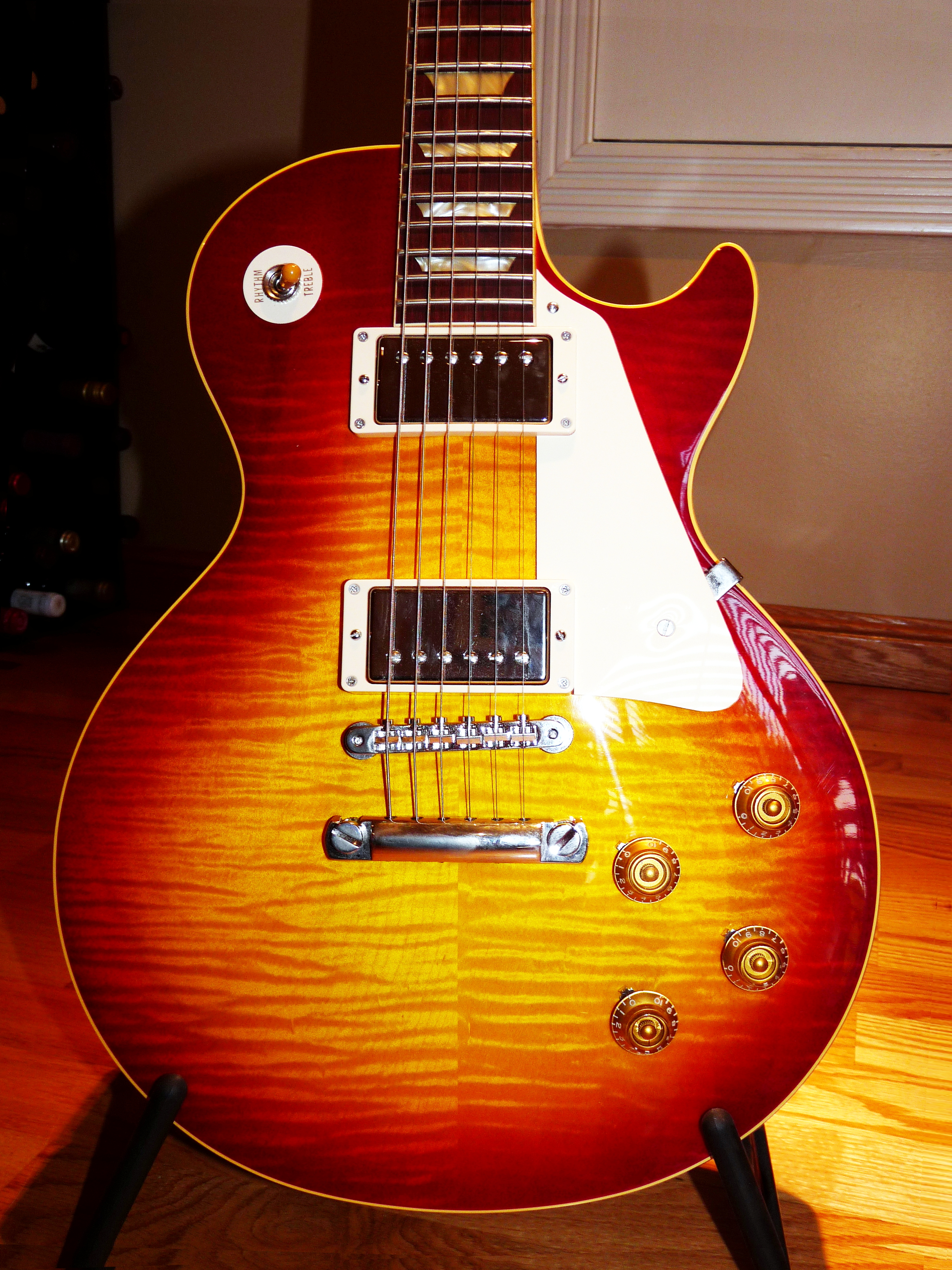
Flame

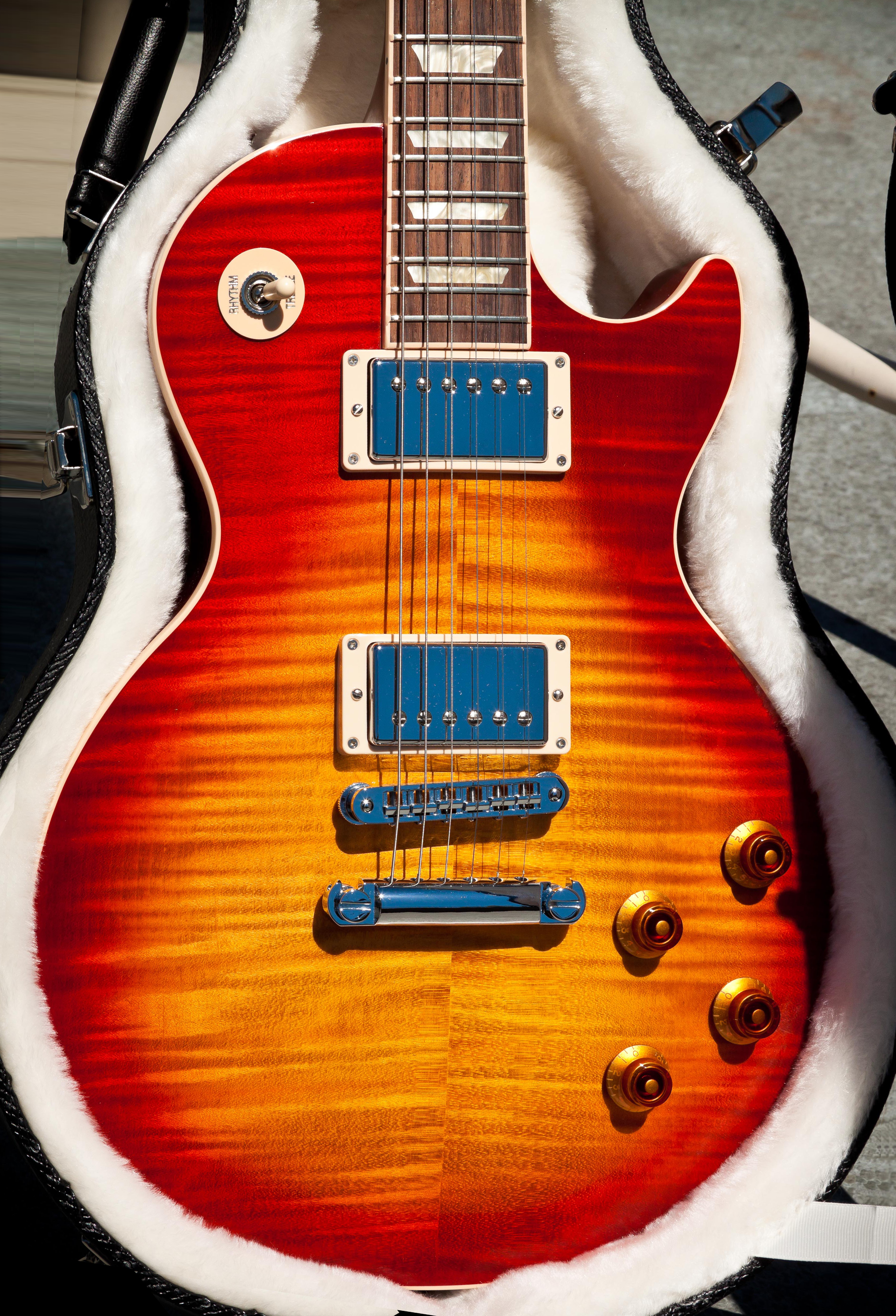
Tiger stripe

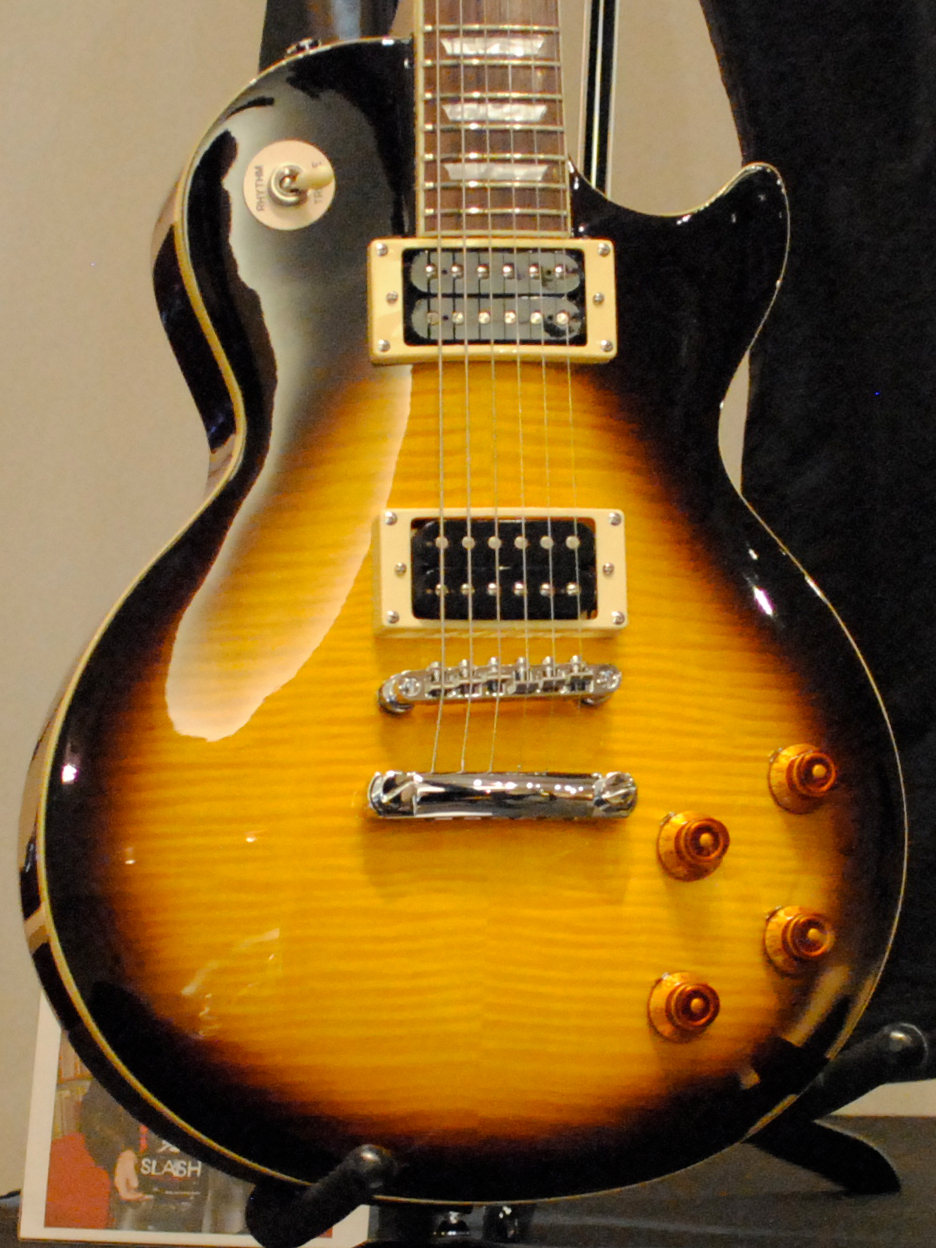
Fiddleback

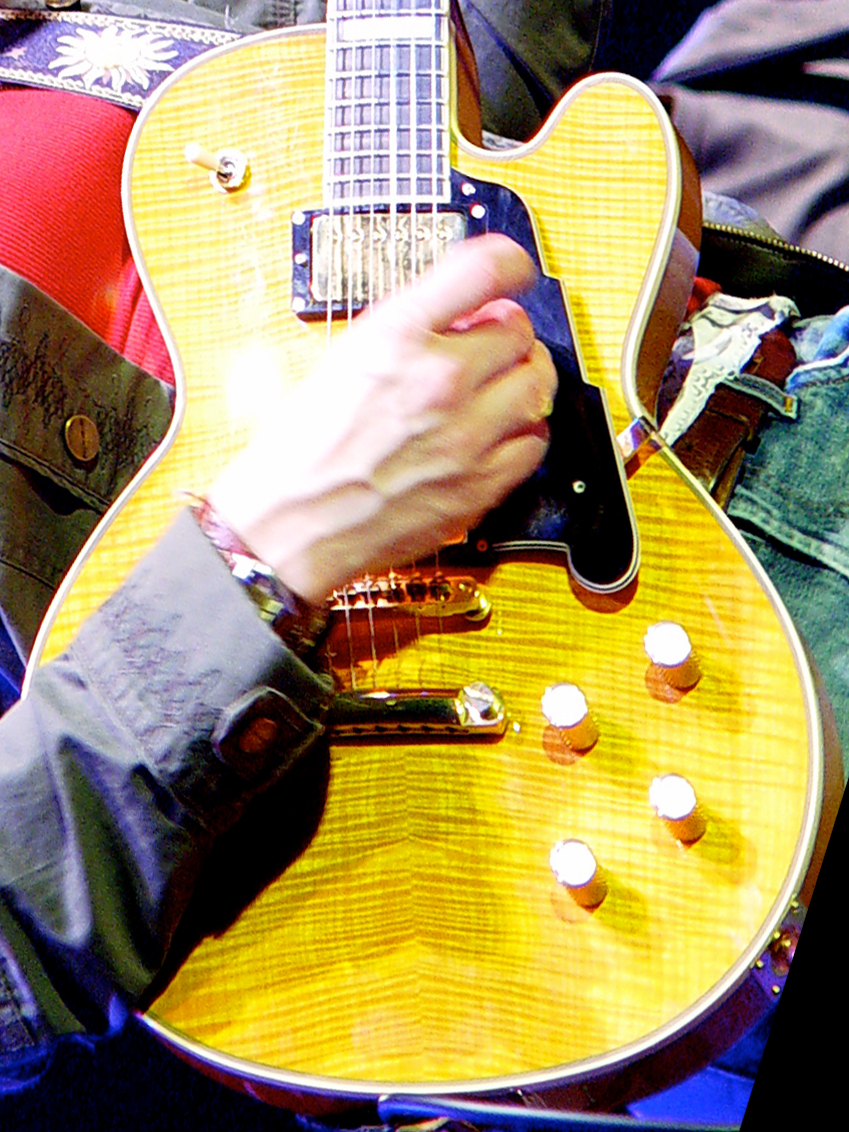
Pin stripe

Other types of figure maple wood (for comparison)

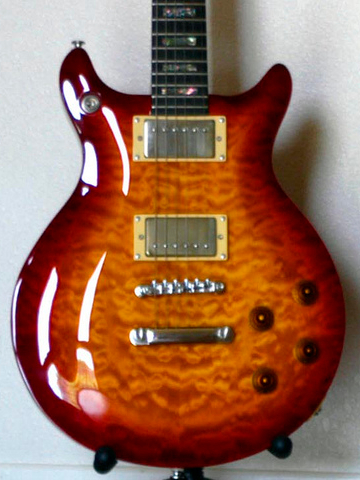
Blister

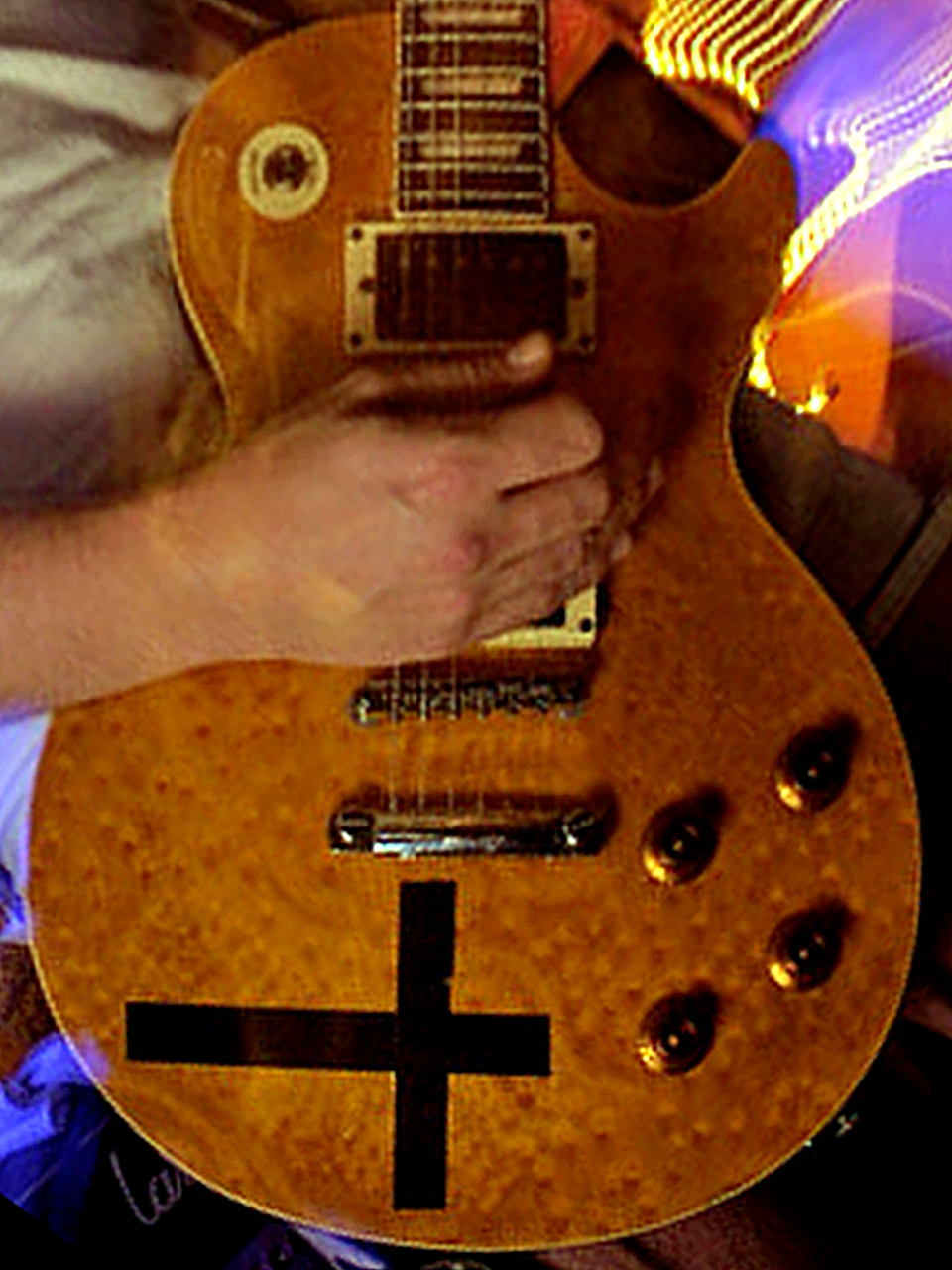
Bird's eye

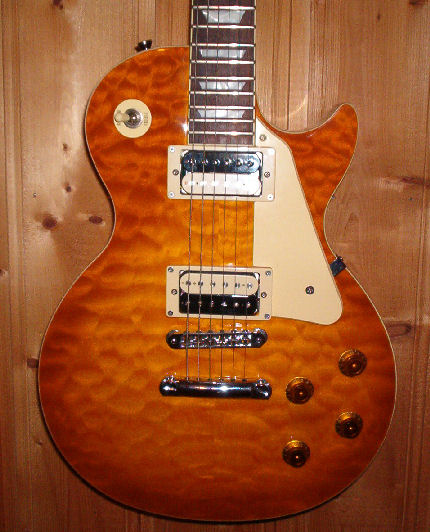
Quilt maple

== See also ==
- Quilt maple
- Birdseye maple
