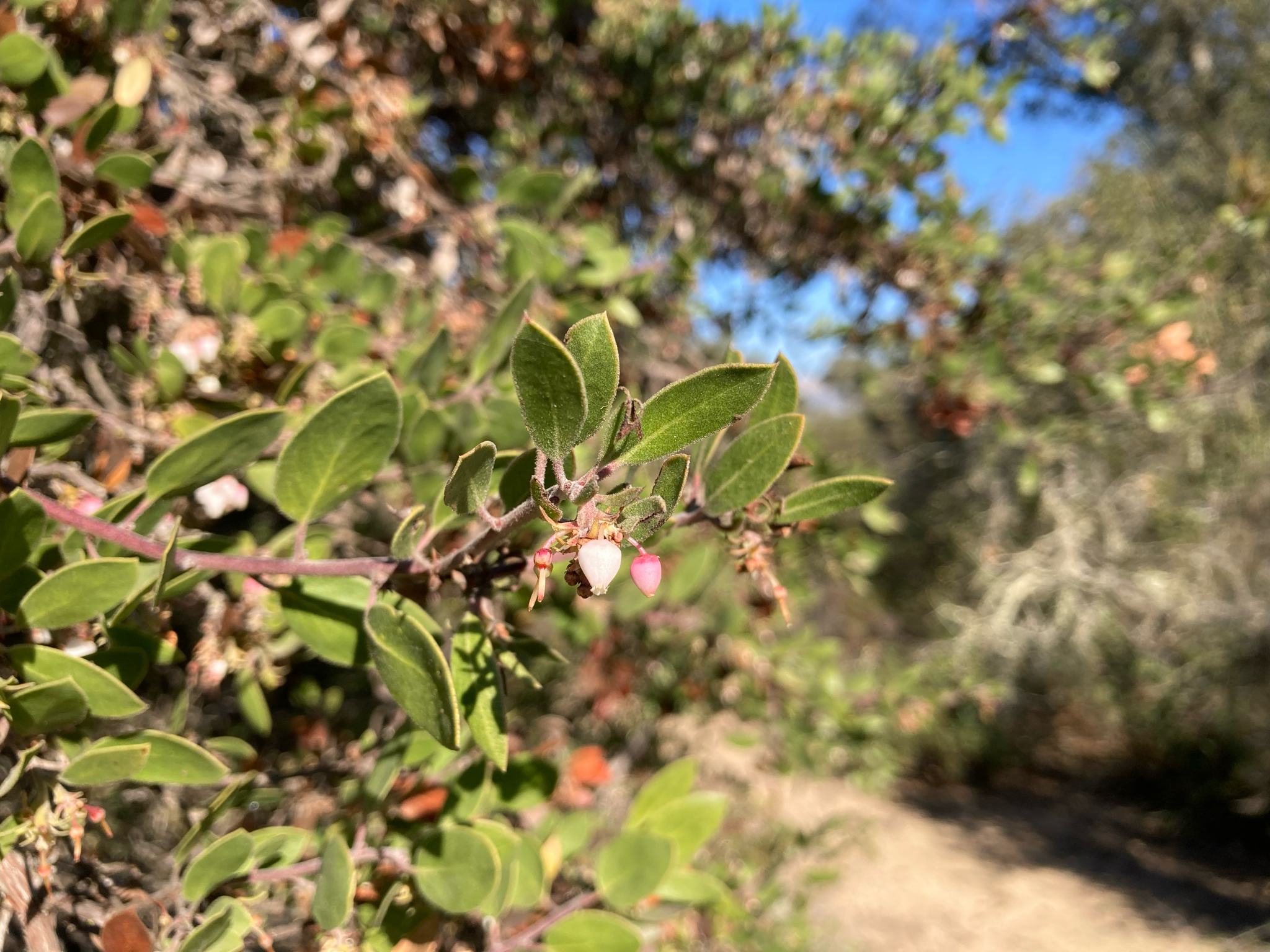

Scientific classification
- Kingdom: Plantae
- Clade: Tracheophytes
- Clade: Angiosperms
- Clade: Eudicots
- Clade: Asterids
- Order: Ericales
- Family: Ericaceae
- Genus: Arctostaphylos
- Species: A. nipumu

Binomial name
- Arctostaphylos nipumu T.Abbo, M.A.Stickrod, A.Krohn, V.T.Parker, M.C.Vasey, W.Waycott & A.Litt.

= Arctostaphylos nipumu =

Species of manzanita

Arctostaphylos nipumu, the Nipomo Mesa manzanita or nipumu manzanita, is a species of manzanita endemic to Nipomo Mesa in San Luis Obispo County, California. It was formerly considered to be the northernmost population of Arctostaphylos rudis, a rare manzanita primarily found near Lompoc. It is highly threatened by development, with only an estimated 300–700 plants in the wild at the time it was described.

== Description ==
A. nipumu is generally a 2-3m tall shrub, lacking a basal burl. It is best recognized by its grey to reddish-grey shredding/shaggy bark, generally apparent in both older and young branches. Twigs have short dense hairs. Leaves are green, generally lanceolate or ovate, point-tipped, and have similar upper and lower surfaces. Flowers are white (pinkish-white), and fruits are orange-red, compressed, multi-seeded-drupes.

== Identification ==
In the wild on Nipomo Mesa, A. nipumu does not overlap with any other manzanita species. It can be distinguished from A. rudis from which it was split by its gray-toned bark and lack of a burl.

== Range ==
A. nipumu is endemic to the Nipomo Mesa region of San Luis Obispo County, California. It is replaced by the hybrid Sand Mesa or Shagbark manzanita (Arctostaphylos rudis) south of the Santa Maria River. Arctostaphylos nipumu is hypothesized to be one of the parents of Shagbark manzanita.

== Habitat ==
A. nipumu is found in sandy maritime chaparral and coast live oak woodland. Its habitat is fragmented by urban and/or agricultural developments, with most of the habitat already having been destroyed by the time this species was described in early 2025.

== Etymology ==
nipumu is a ytt (Northern Chumash language) word meaning "of the big house" and is the yak tityu tityu yak tiłhini, first nation, word for the Nipomo Mesa region. ytt does not include capitalization so the transliteration 'nipumu' should always be written in lower case.
