= Figure (wood) =

Description of the appearance of wood

In wood, figure refers to the general appearance of wood, as seen on a longitudinal surface (side-grain), either in the tangential or the radial surfaces.

Mountain ash floor, showing some fiddleback figure

== Description ==
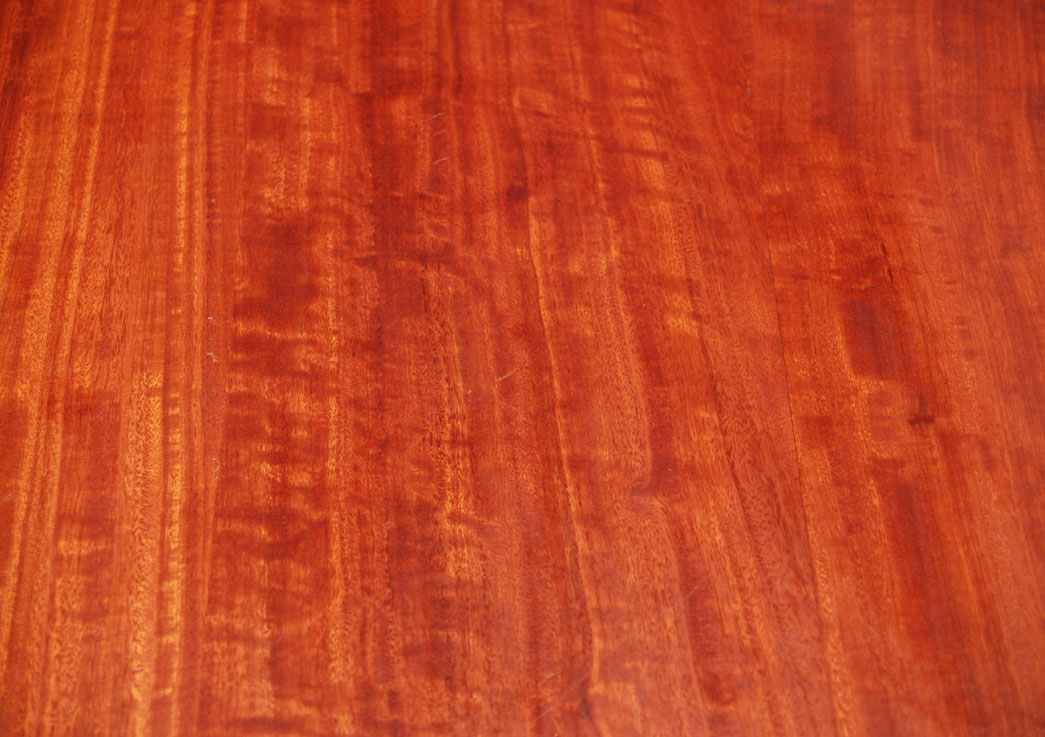
Typically figured red gum table

In wood, figure refers to the appearance of wood, as seen on a longitudinal surface (side-grain). A figured wood is not plain.

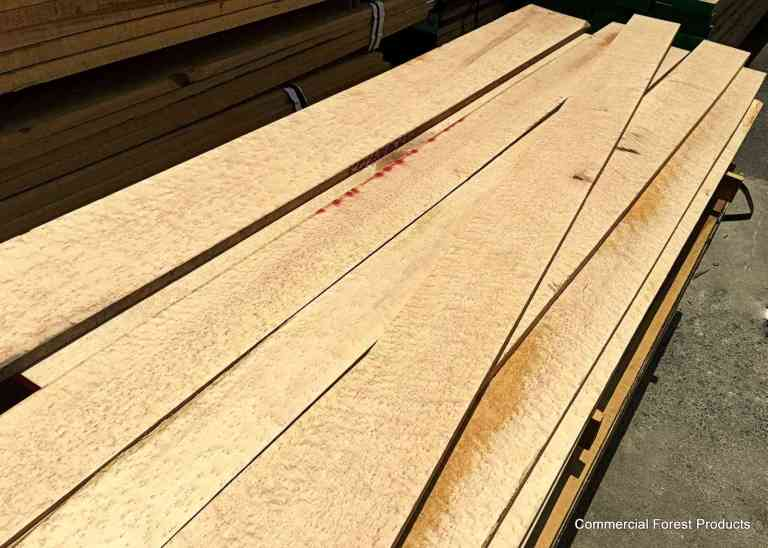
Birdseye figure in Northern Sugar Maple lumber boards

The figure of a particular piece of wood is, in part, due to its grain and, in part, due to the cut, or to innate properties of the wood.

== Types ==
A few of the tropical hardwoods, like the rosewoods, may have a unique figure. Types of figure include:

- angel step
- bear scratches
- bird's eye
- blister
- burl
- curl
- ribbon curl
- dimple
- fiddleback
- flame
- wide flame
- ghost
- pin stripe
- quilted
- spalted
- tiger stripe
