= Bird's eye figure =

Appearance and pattern in wood

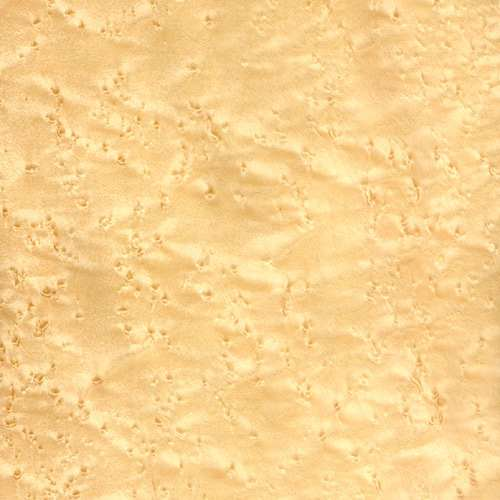
Cutting Board made of Birdseye Maple

Bird's eye is a type of figure that occurs within several kinds of wood, most notably hard maple. It has a distinctive pattern that resembles tiny, swirling eyes disrupting the smooth lines of grain. It is somewhat reminiscent of a burl, but it is quite different: the small knots that make the burl are missing.

It is not known what causes the phenomenon. Research into the cultivation of bird's eye maple has so far discounted the theories that it is caused by pecking birds deforming the wood grain or that an infecting fungus makes it twist. However, no one has demonstrated a complete understanding of any combination of climate, soil, tree variety, insects, viruses, or genetic mutations that may produce the effect.

Bird's eye maple is most often found in Acer saccharum (sugar maple), but millers also find bird's eye figures in red maple, white ash, Cuban mahogany, American beech, black walnut, and yellow birch. Trees that grow in the Great Lakes region of Canada and the United States yield the greatest supply, along with some varieties in the Rocky Mountains. It is not uncommon in Huon pine, which grows only in Tasmania. Although a tree's bark may offer a few clues that indicate the lumber might have bird's eye figure, felling the tree and cutting it apart is necessary to know for sure.

== Characteristics ==
In most characteristics, wood with bird's eye figure is no different from the rest of the wood from the same tree. Depending on the frequency and radius of the birdseye swirls, each 1/8 to 3/8 inch (0.32 to 0.95 cm) wide, the wood may be extremely valuable. While woodworkers prize the timber primarily for its use in veneers, it also turns well on a lathe, allowing it to be shaped into decorative canes, chair legs, and handles.

== Uses ==
Bird's eye maple may be expensive, up to several times the cost of ordinary hardwood. It is used in refined specialty products, such as in automobile trim, both in solid form and veneer, boxes and bowls for jewelry, thin veneer, humidors, canes, furniture inlays, handles, guitars, bowed instruments, custom rifle stocks and pool cues are popular uses. Items made with this wood tend to be more expensive not only because the wood is more costly but because it is harder to work. When working with bird's eye wood, it is advisable to take care in what tools are used, so as to prevent grain tearout. Also the more "eyes" lumber has, the weaker the wood tends to be.

== Gallery ==
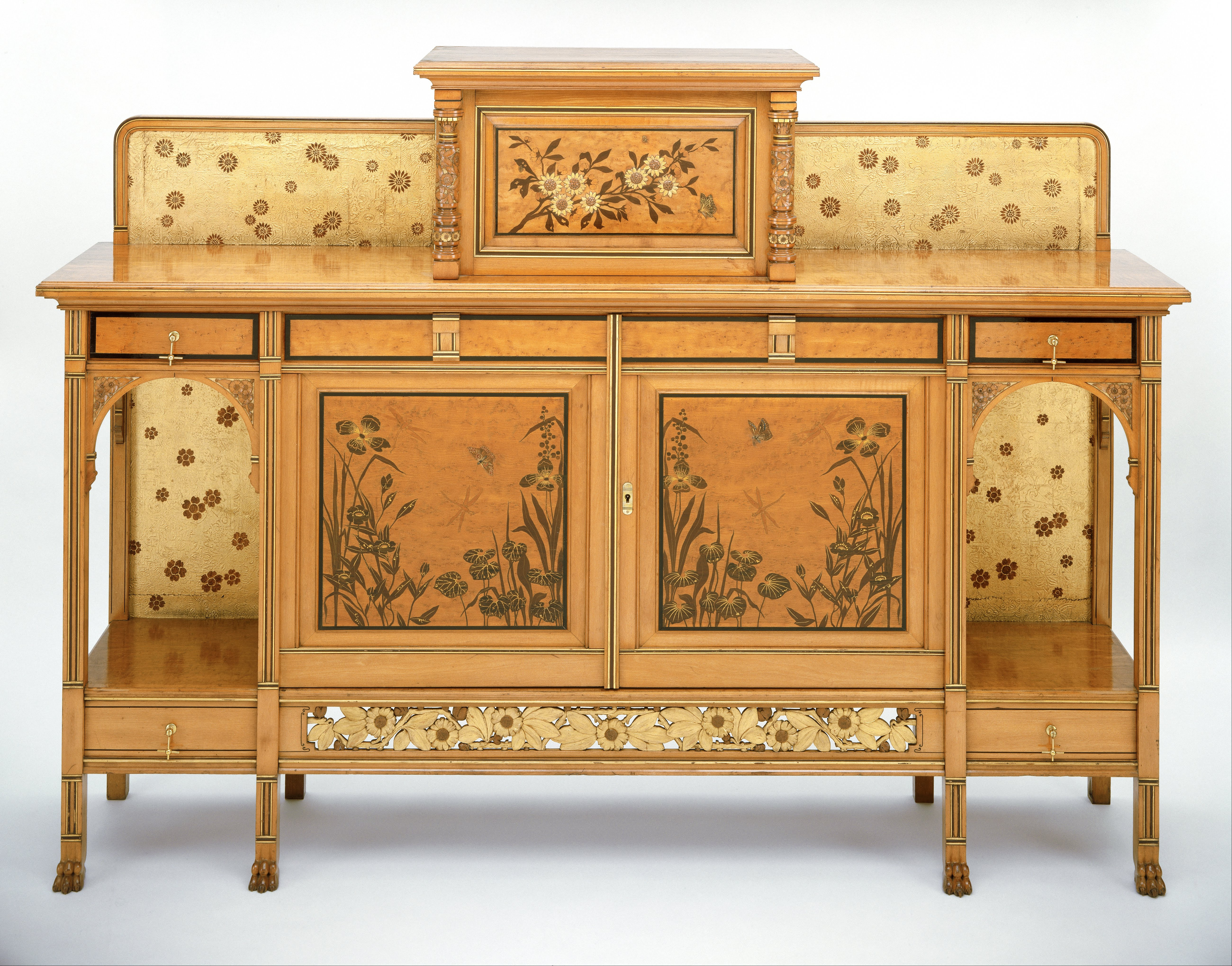
Cabinet (c.1880) by Herter Brothers

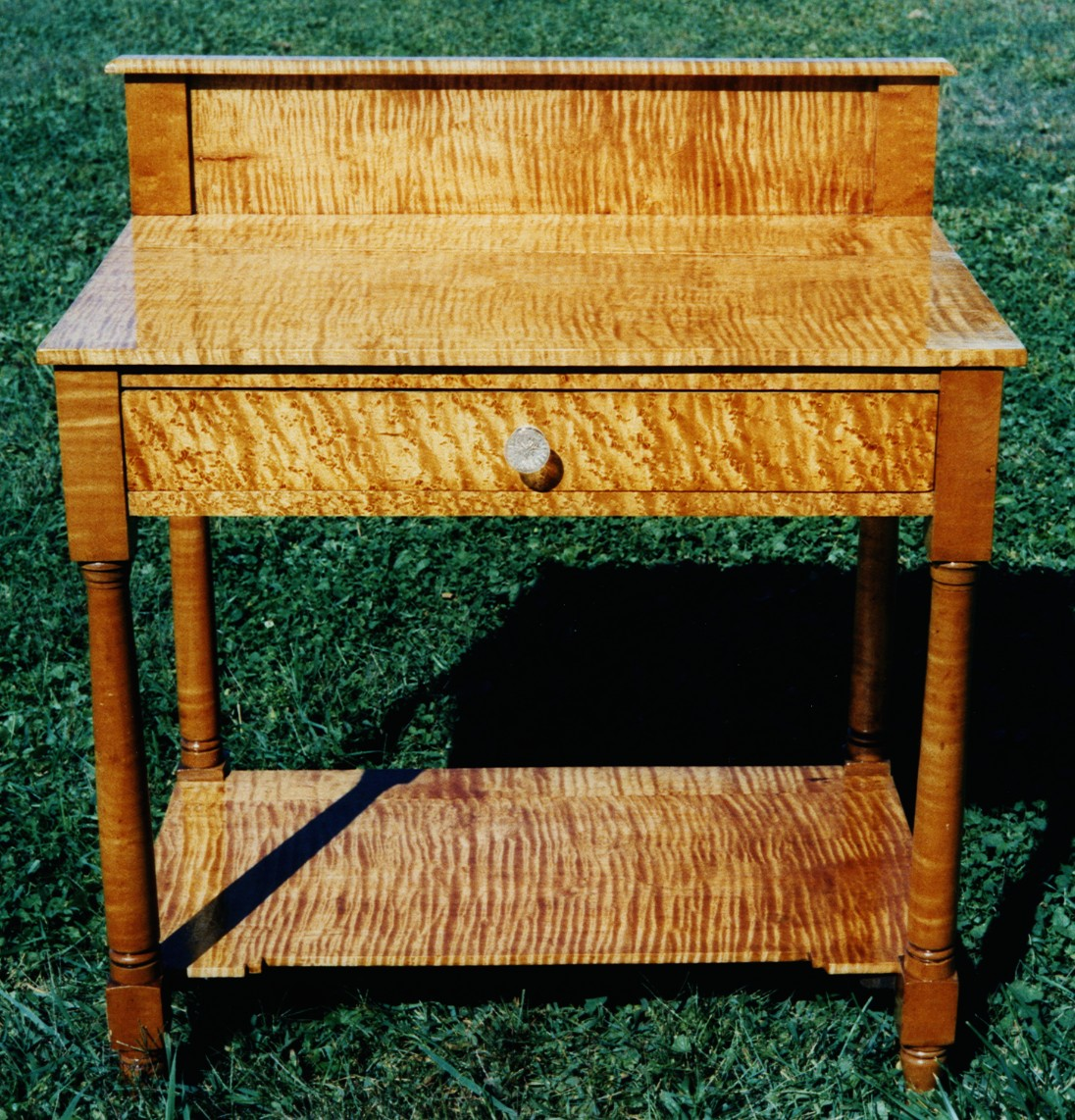
Washstand: bird's eye can be seen on the surface of drawer.

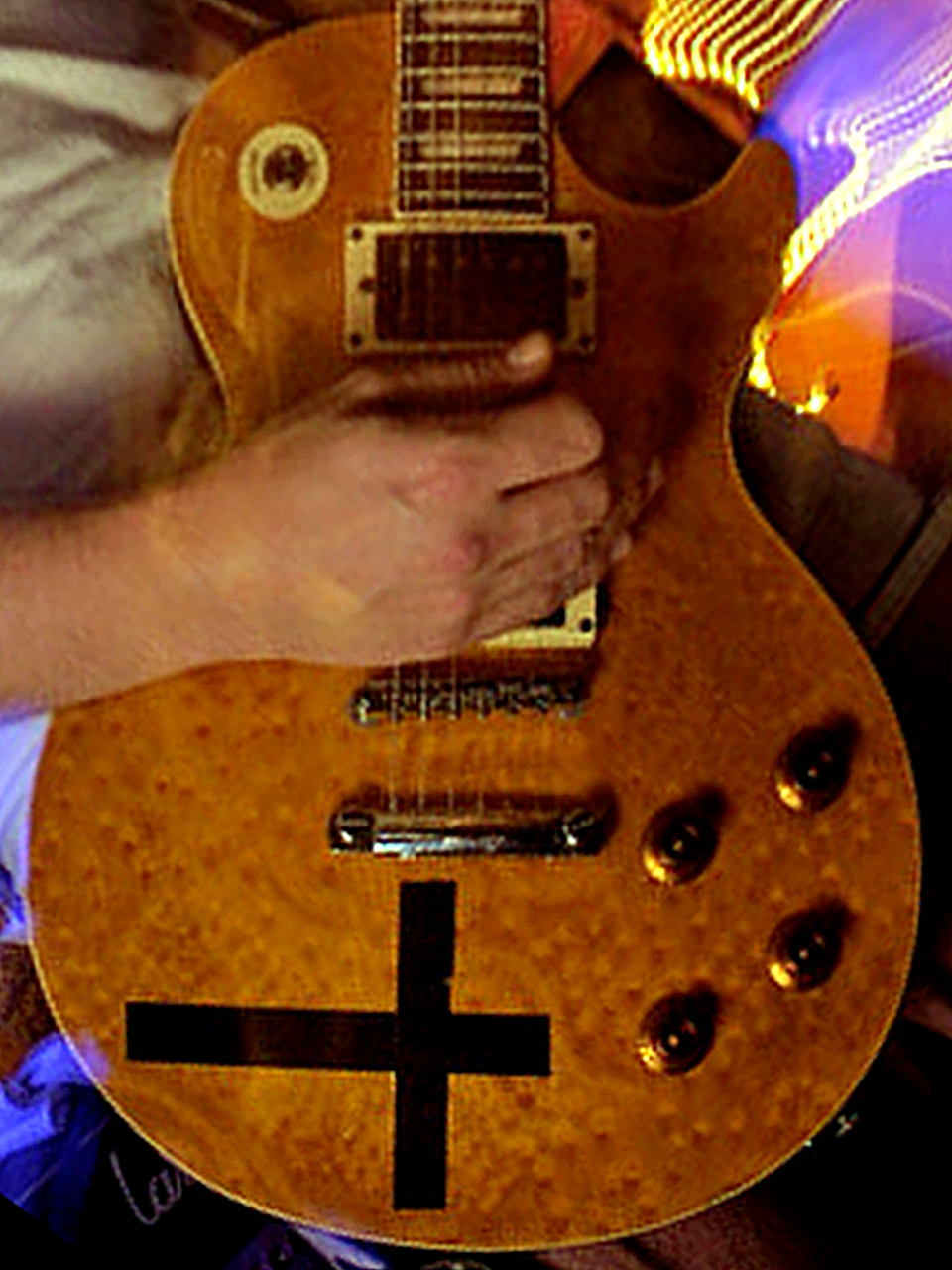
Epiphone Les Paul Classic Birdseye (1994–98) body

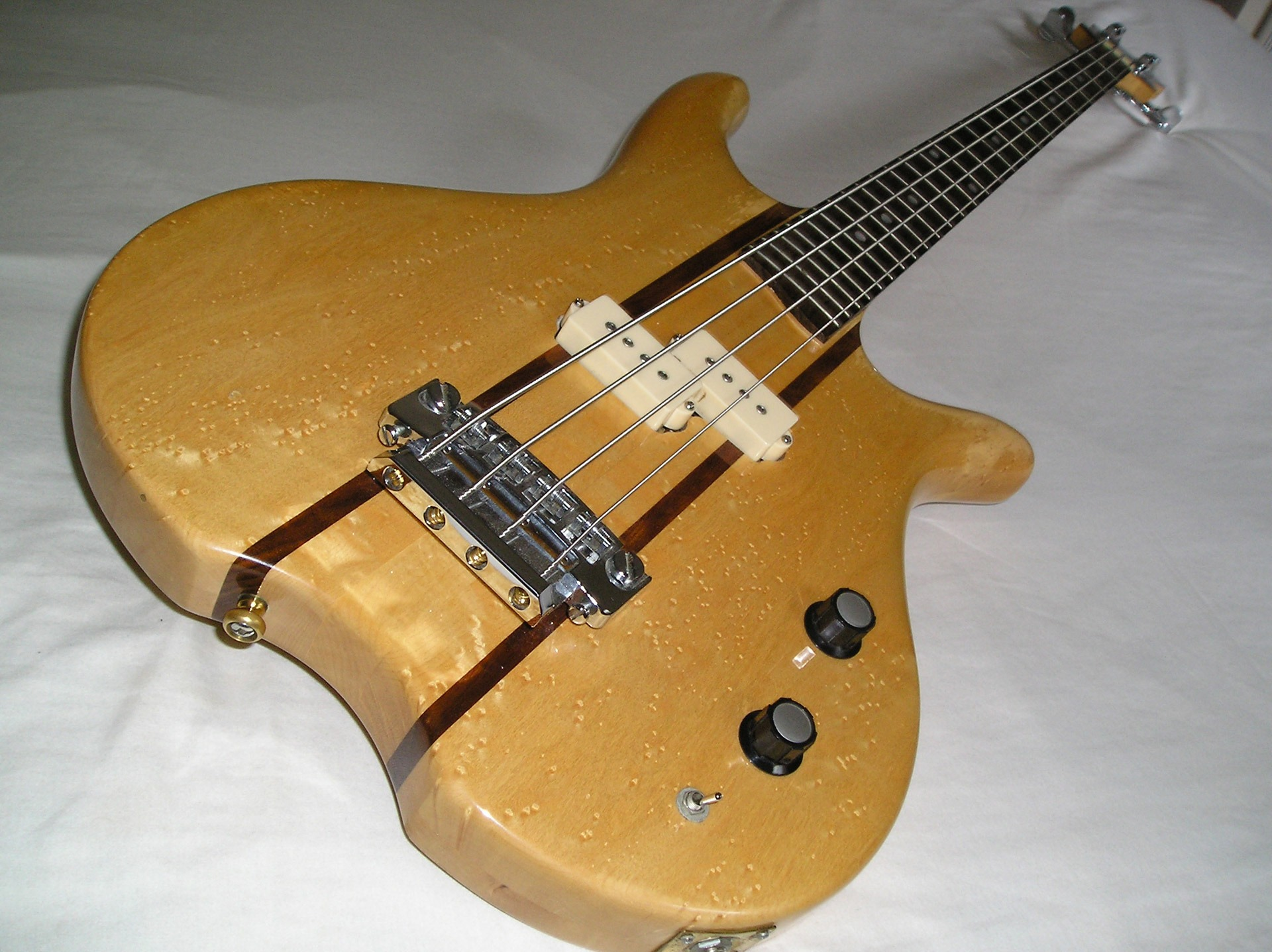
Electric bass guitar with bird's eye maple top

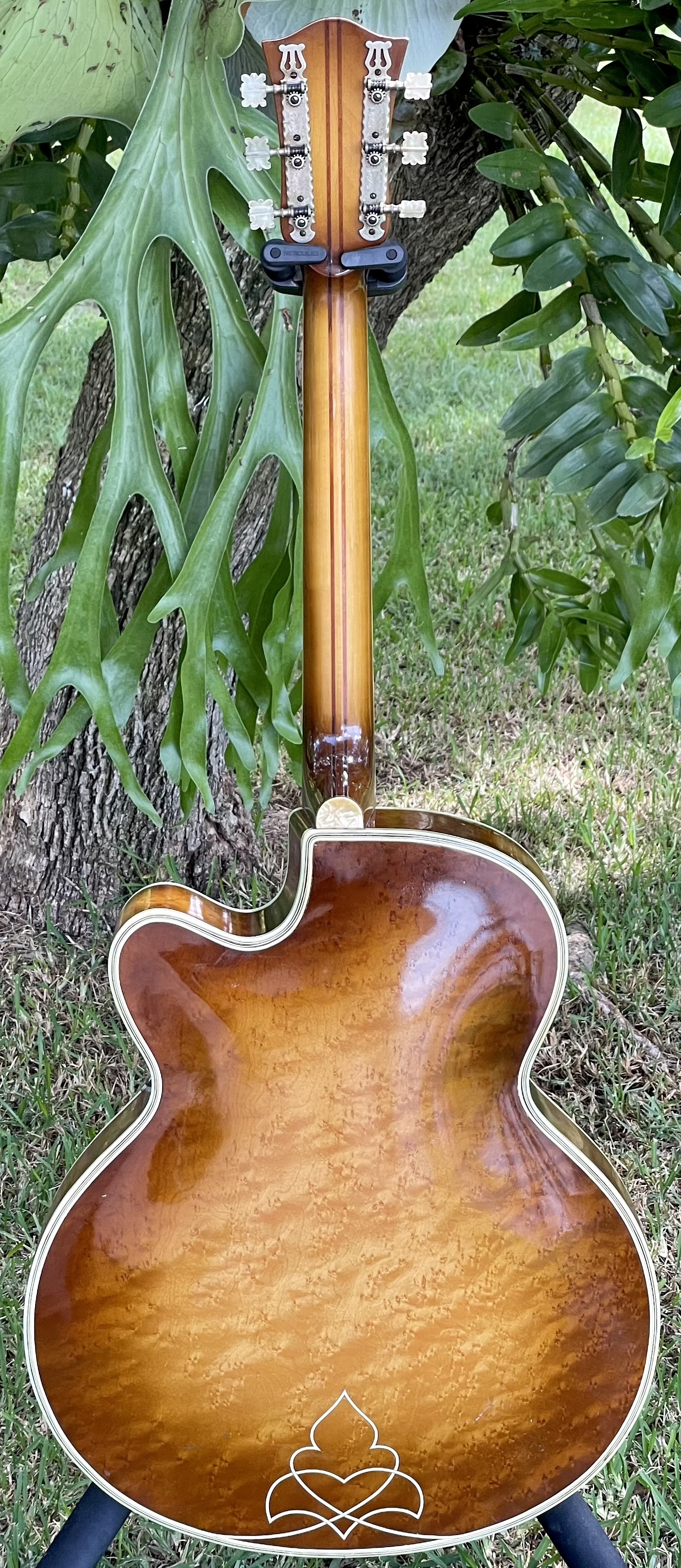
Höfner 468 archtop guitar back hand-carved from solid piece of bird's eye maple. Made in Germany, 19 Feb 1961.
