= Burl =

Deformed tree outgrowth

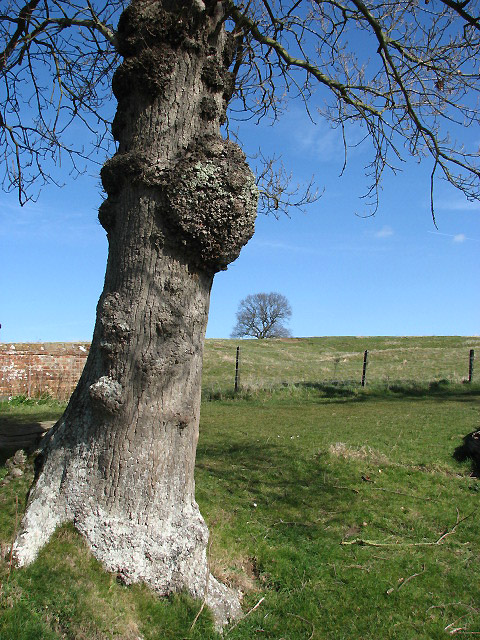
Burrs on a tree trunk in Norfolk, England

A burl (American English) or burr (British English) is a tree growth in which the grain has grown in a deformed manner. It is commonly found in the form of a rounded outgrowth on a tree trunk or branch that is filled with small knots from dormant buds. Burl formation is typically a result of some form of stress such as an injury or a viral or fungal infection. More scientifically, a burl is "the result of hyperplasia, a greatly abnormal proliferation of xylem production by the vascular cambium".

Burls yield a very peculiar and highly figured wood sought after in woodworking, and some items may reach high prices on the wood market. Poaching of burl specimens and damaging the trees in the process poses a problem in some areas.

== Description ==
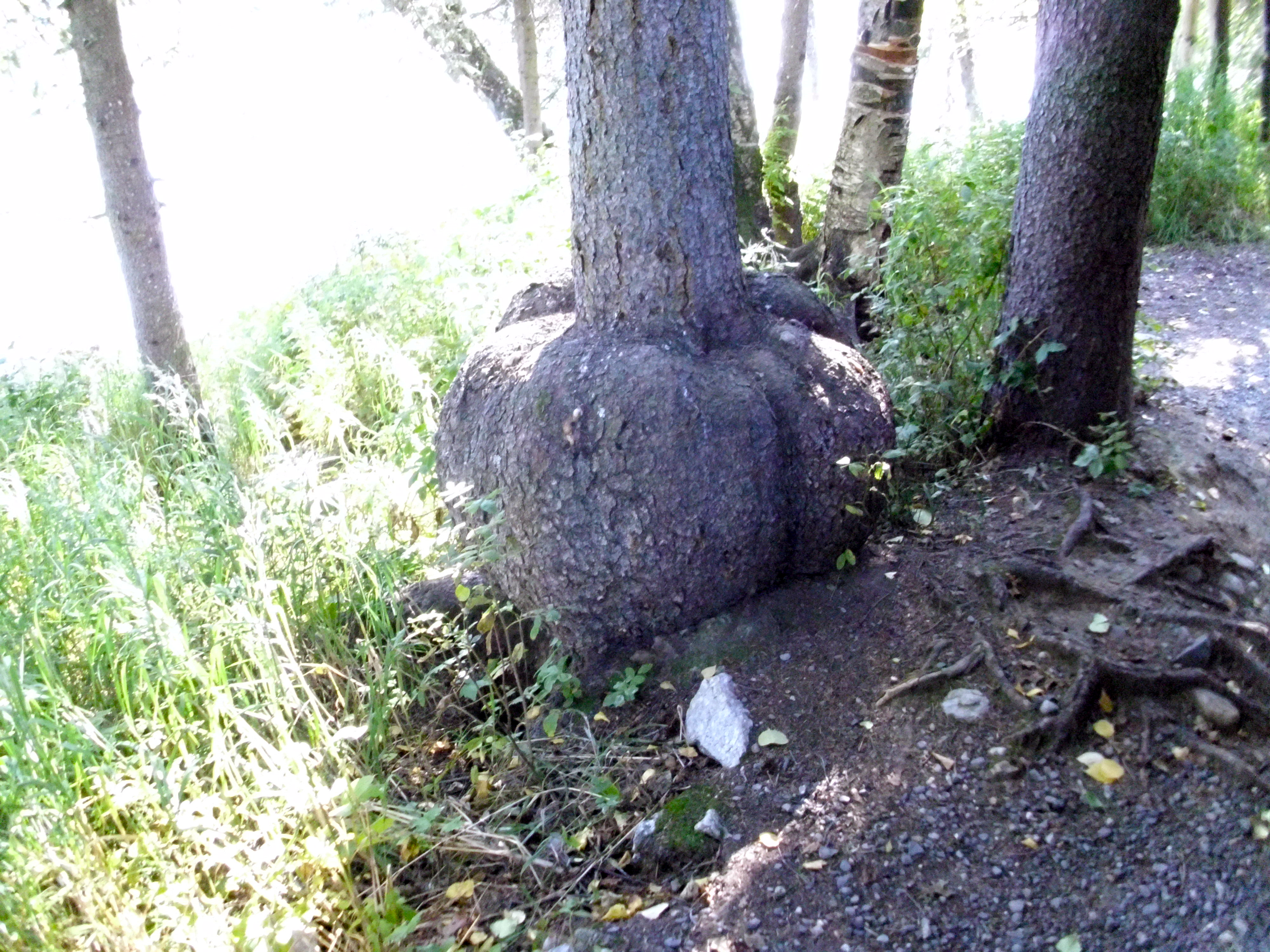
Large burl on a spruce tree at Denali State Park, Alaska

A burl results from a tree undergoing some form of stress. It may be caused by a virus, fungus or Agrobacterium tumefaciens entering the plant through an injury. Most burls grow beneath the ground, attached to the roots as a type of malignancy that is generally not discovered until the tree dies or falls over. Such burls sometimes appear as groups of bulbous protrusions connected by a system of rope-like roots. Almost all burl wood is covered by bark, even if it is underground.

In some tree species, burls can grow to great size. The largest, at 26 ft (8 m), occur in coast redwoods (Sequoia sempervirens) and can engirdle the entire trunk; when moisture is present, these burls can grow new redwood trees. One of the world's largest burls can be found in Port McNeill, British Columbia.

The prized "burr maple" is not a species of a maple, but wood from a maple's burl (burr). Birdseye maple of the sugar maple (Acer saccharum) superficially resembles burr maple, but the causes of the bird's eye figure are unknown.

== Use ==
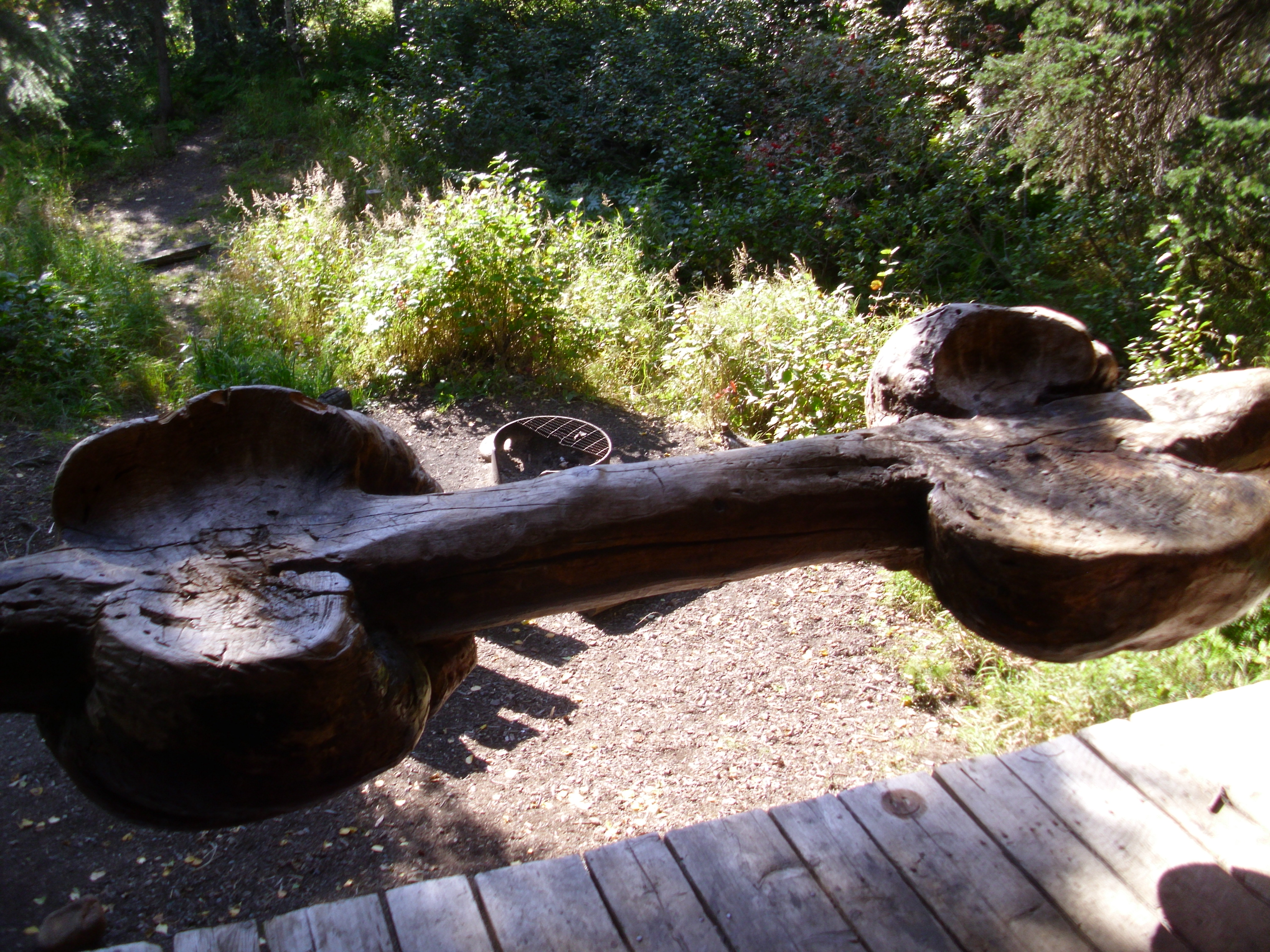
A burled spruce log carved for use as a railing with built-in seats on a log cabin

Burls yield a highly figured wood, valued for its unusual aspect and rarity. It is sought after by furniture makers, artists, and wood sculptors. There are a number of well-known types of burls (each from a particular species); these are sliced into veneers for furniture, inlay in doors, picture frames, household objects, automobile interior paneling and trim, musical instruments, and woodturning.

== Working the wood ==
Burl wood is very hard to work with hand tools or on a lathe, because its grain is twisted and interlocked, causing it to chip and shatter unpredictably. This "wild grain" makes burl wood extremely dense and resistant to splitting, which made it valued for bowls, mallets, mauls and "beetles" or "beadles" for hammering chisels and driving wooden pegs.

== Poaching ==
Because of the value of burls, ancient redwoods in national parks in the Western United States have recently been poached by thieves for their burls, including at Redwood National and State Parks. Poachers often cut off the burls from the sides of the trunks using chainsaws, which exposes the tree to infection and disease, or fell the entire tree to steal burls higher up. Because of the risk of poaching, Jeff Denny, the state park's redwood coast sector supervisor, encourages those buying burl to inquire where it came from and to ensure it was obtained legally. Legal acquisition methods for burl include trees from private land cleared for new development and from lumber companies with salvage permits.

== Gallery ==
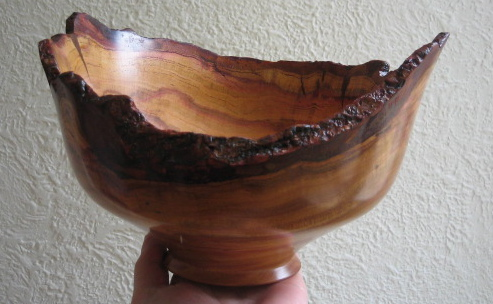
A bowl made from a plum tree burl

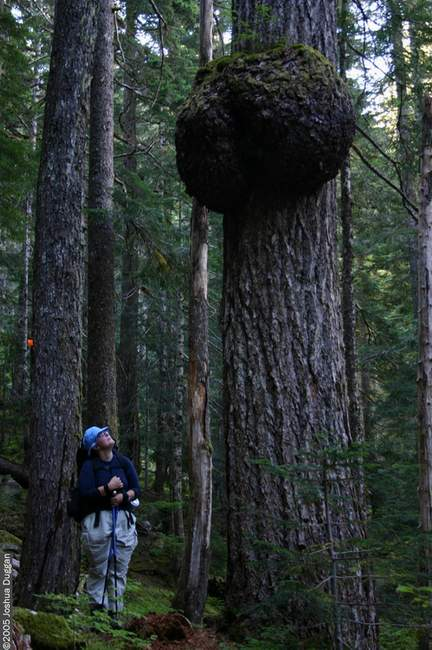
A giant burl near Solduc Falls in the Olympic National Park

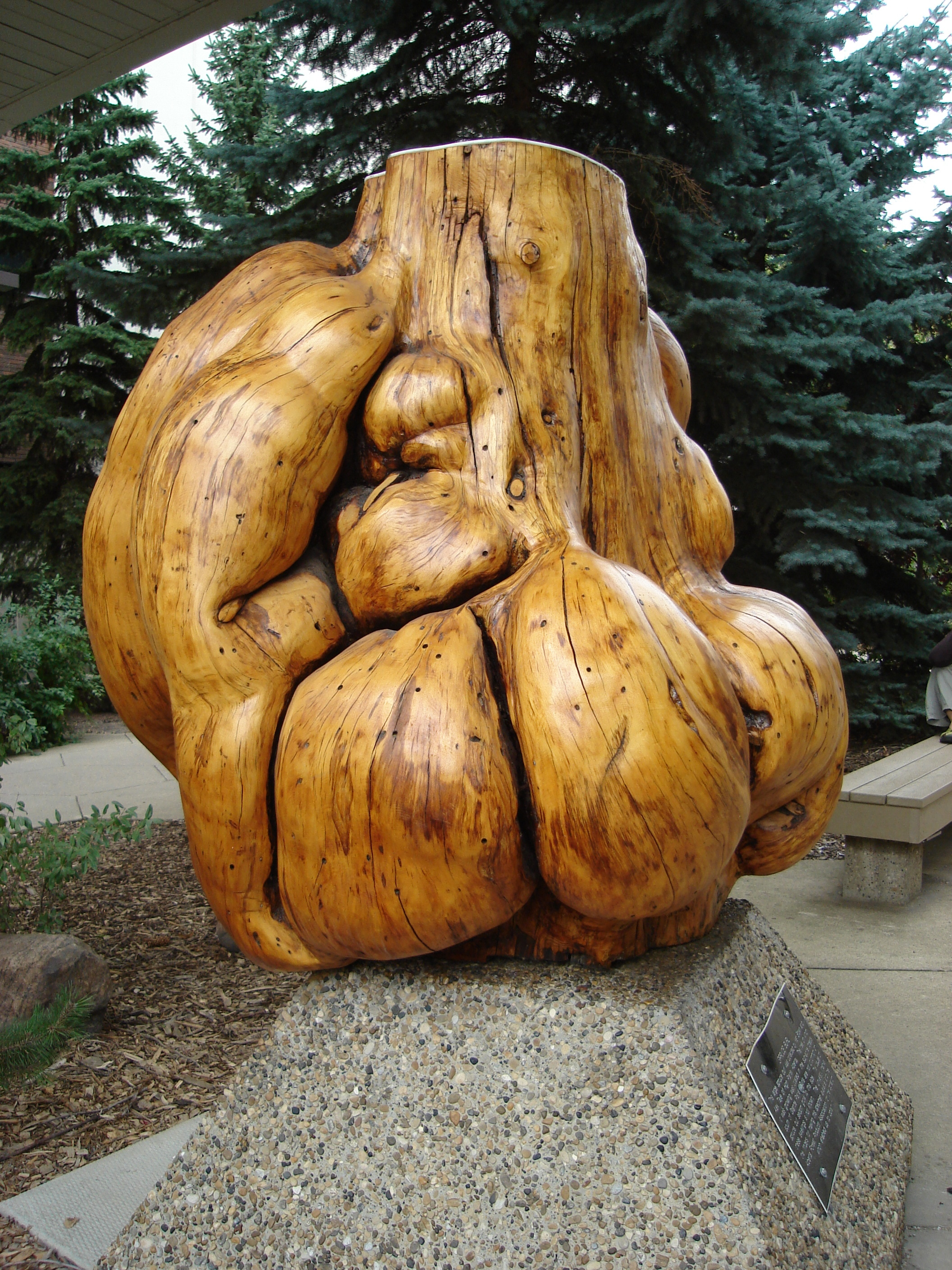
A large spruce burl on display at the University of Alberta

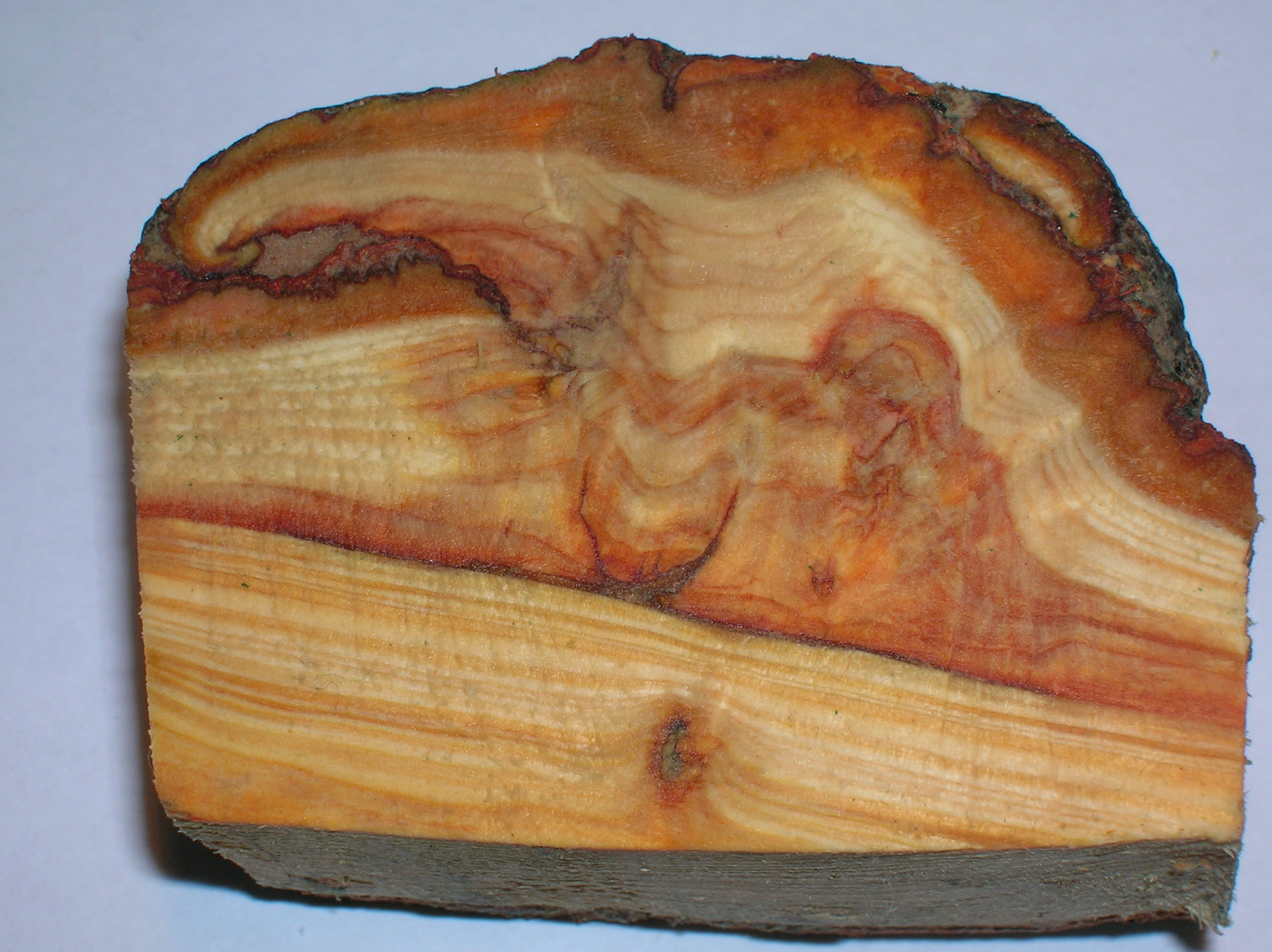
A longitudinal section through a larch burl from Ayrshire, Scotland

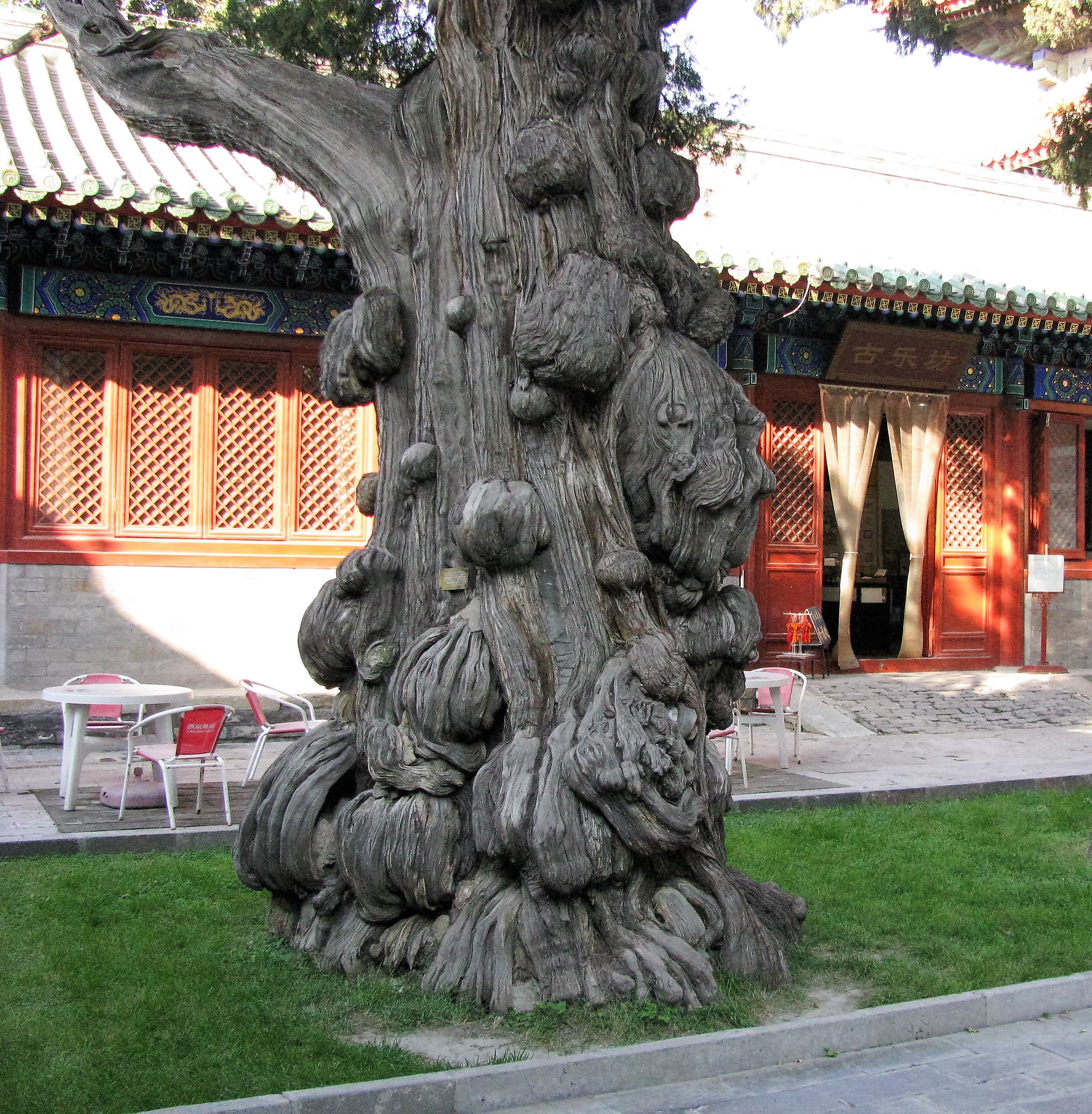
Multiple burls on an ancient cypress tree at the Beijing Temple of Confucius in China

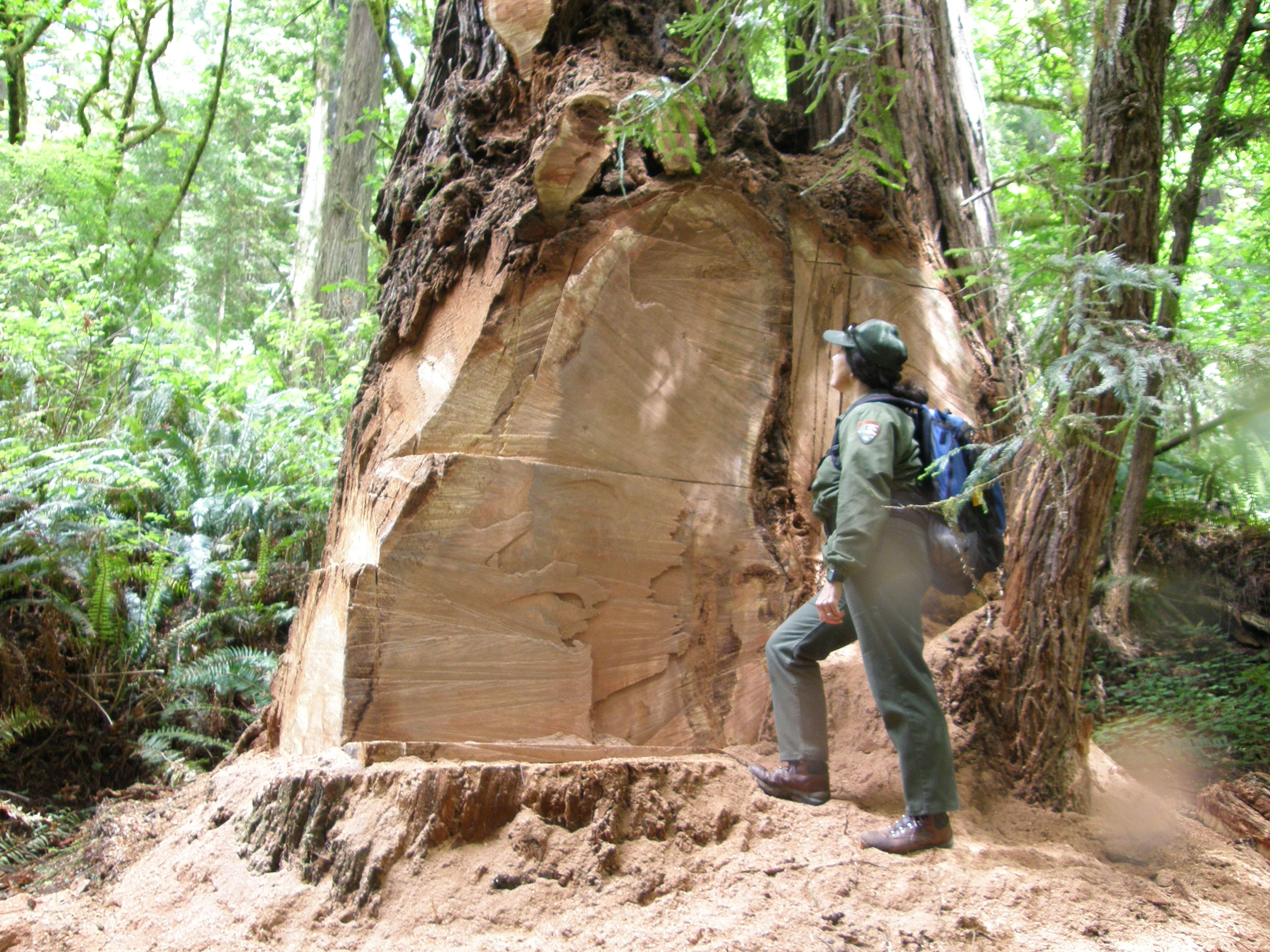
A park ranger inspects a redwood tree illegally cut to obtain a burl, Redwood National Park, California

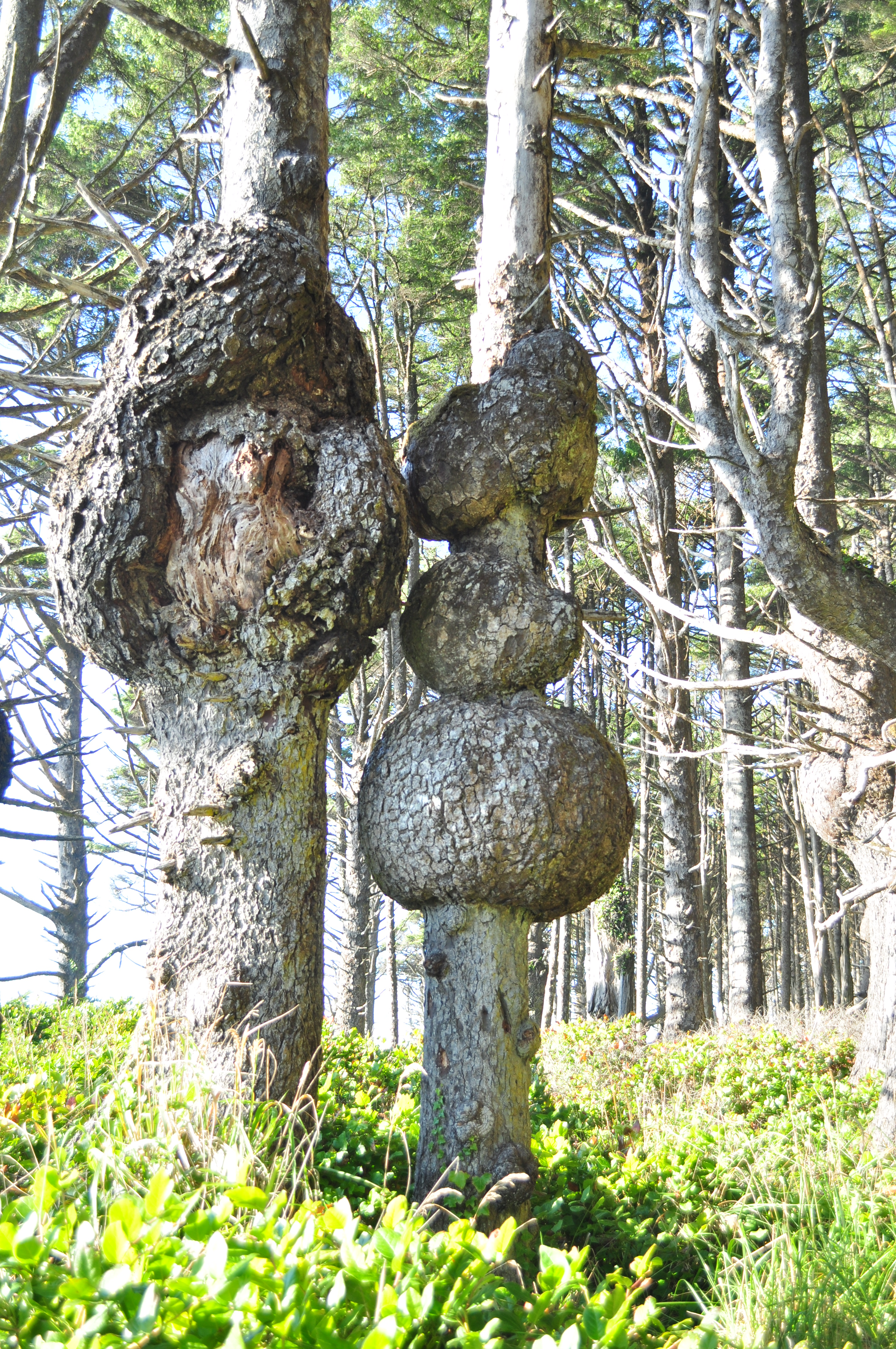
Burls on Sitka spruces, Olympic National Park, Washington, US

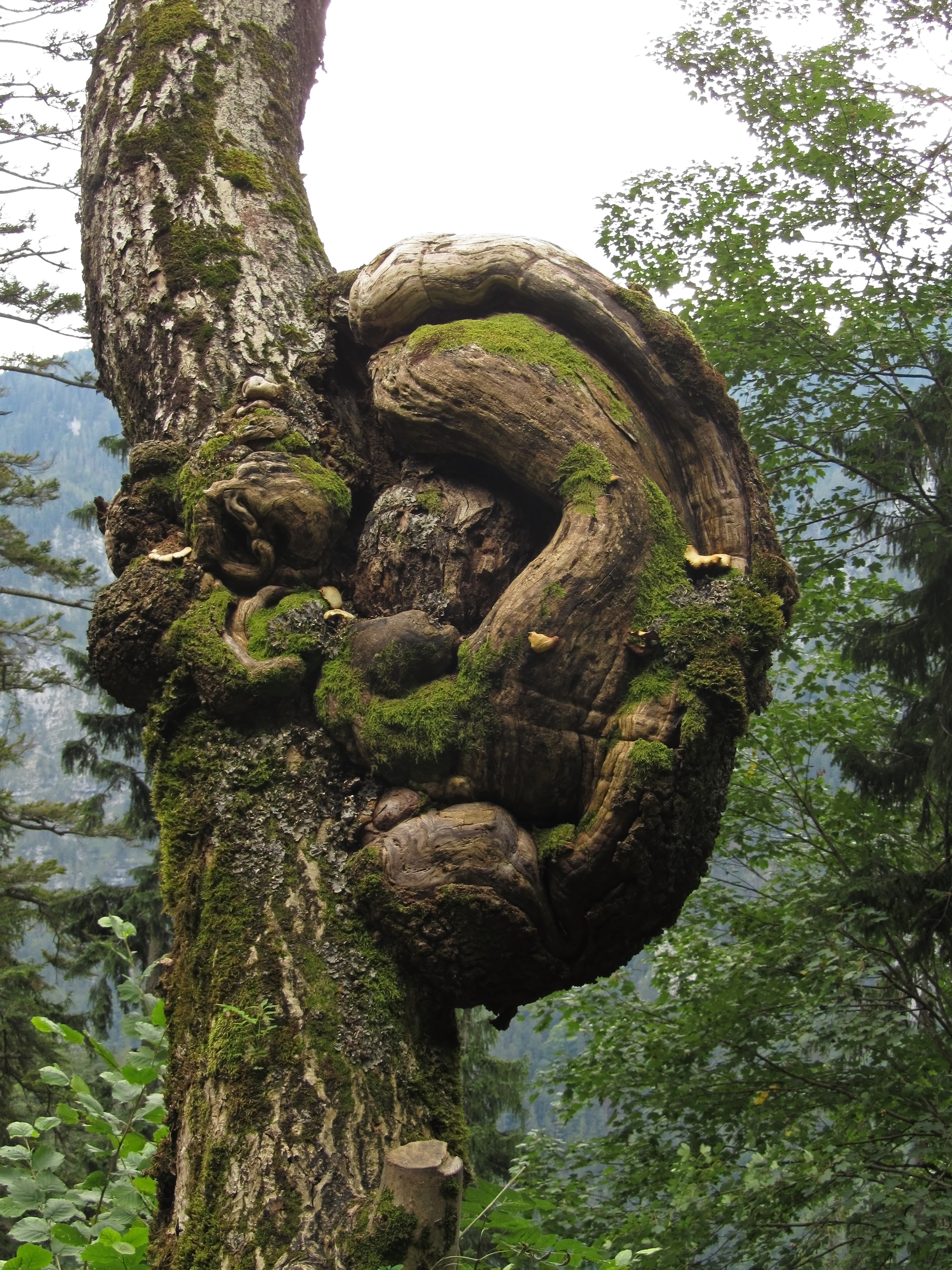
Burl near Palfau,
in central Austria

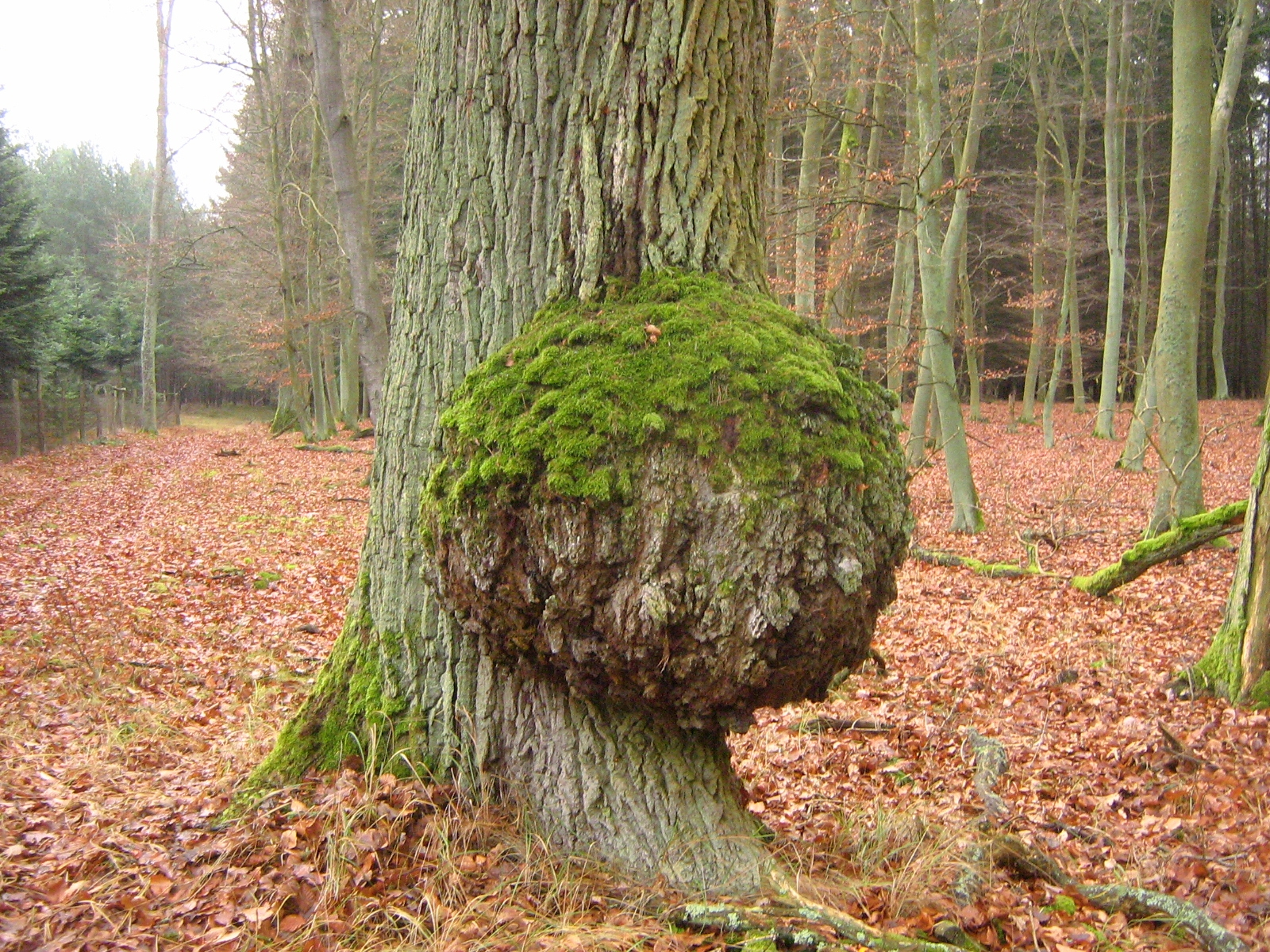
Burl on a sessile oak
(Quercus petraea)
Brohmer Bergen, Germany

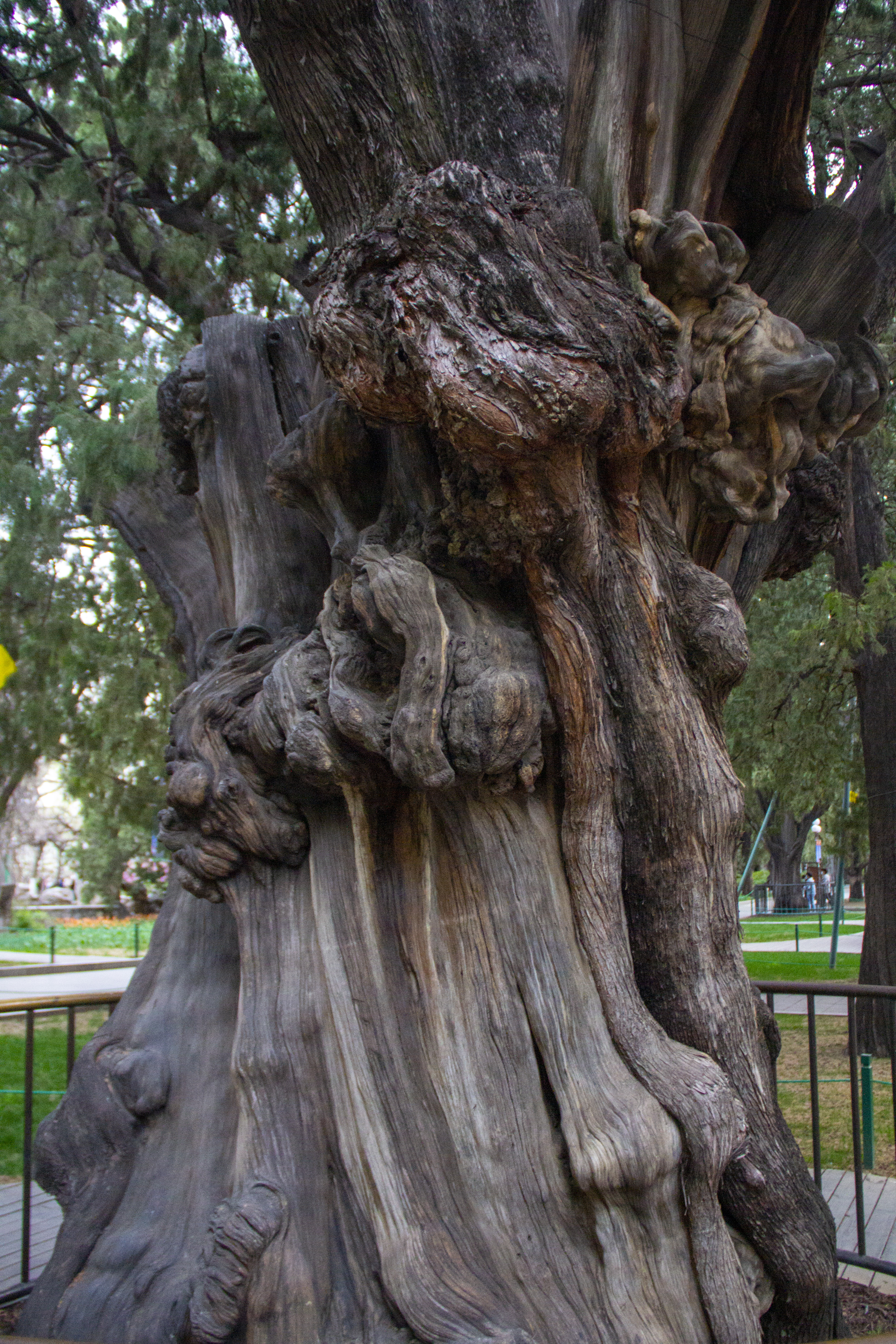
One of several thousand-year-old Platycladus with many burls in Zhongshan Park, west of Tian'anmen

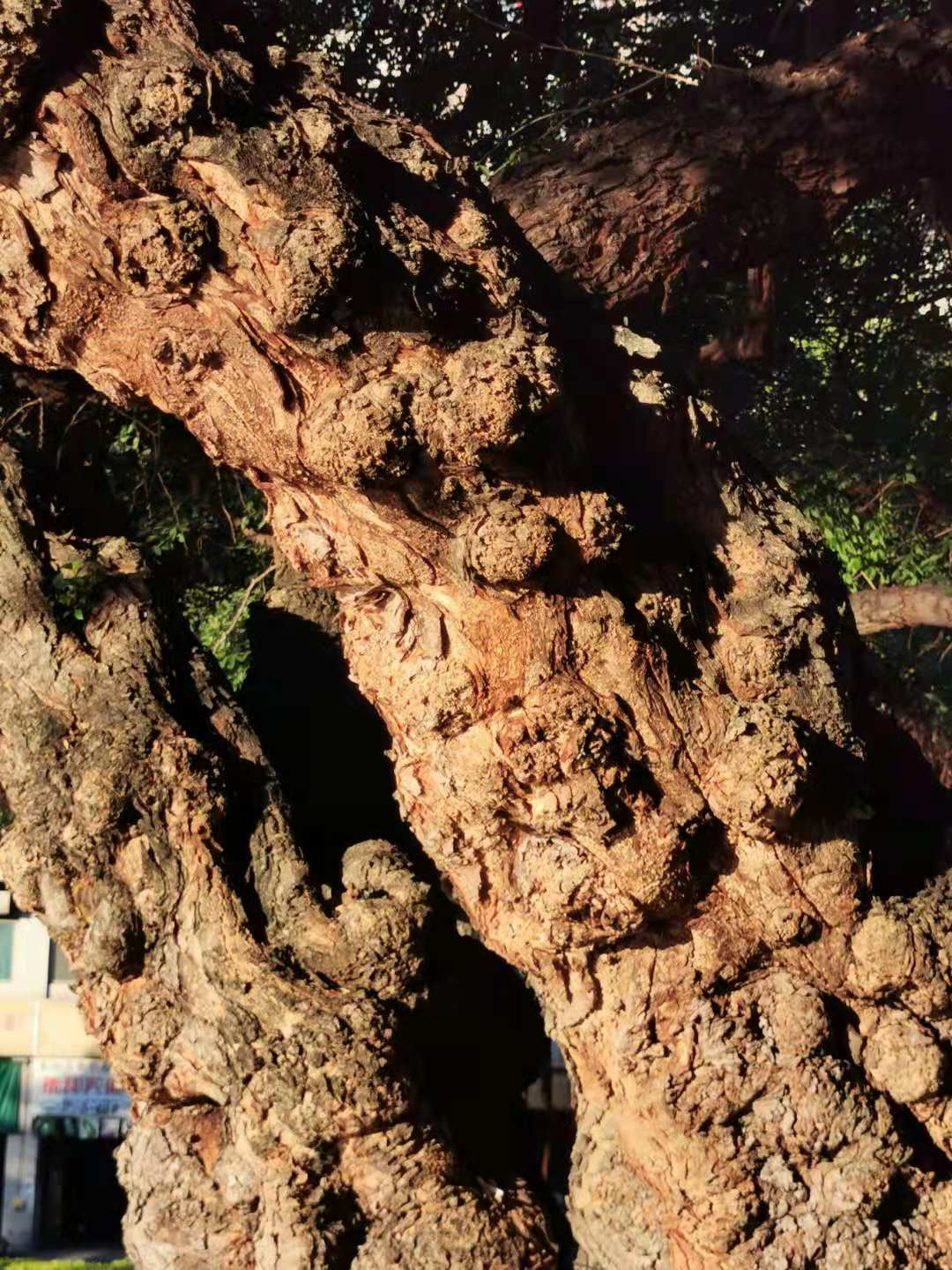
Burls Pithecellobium dulce

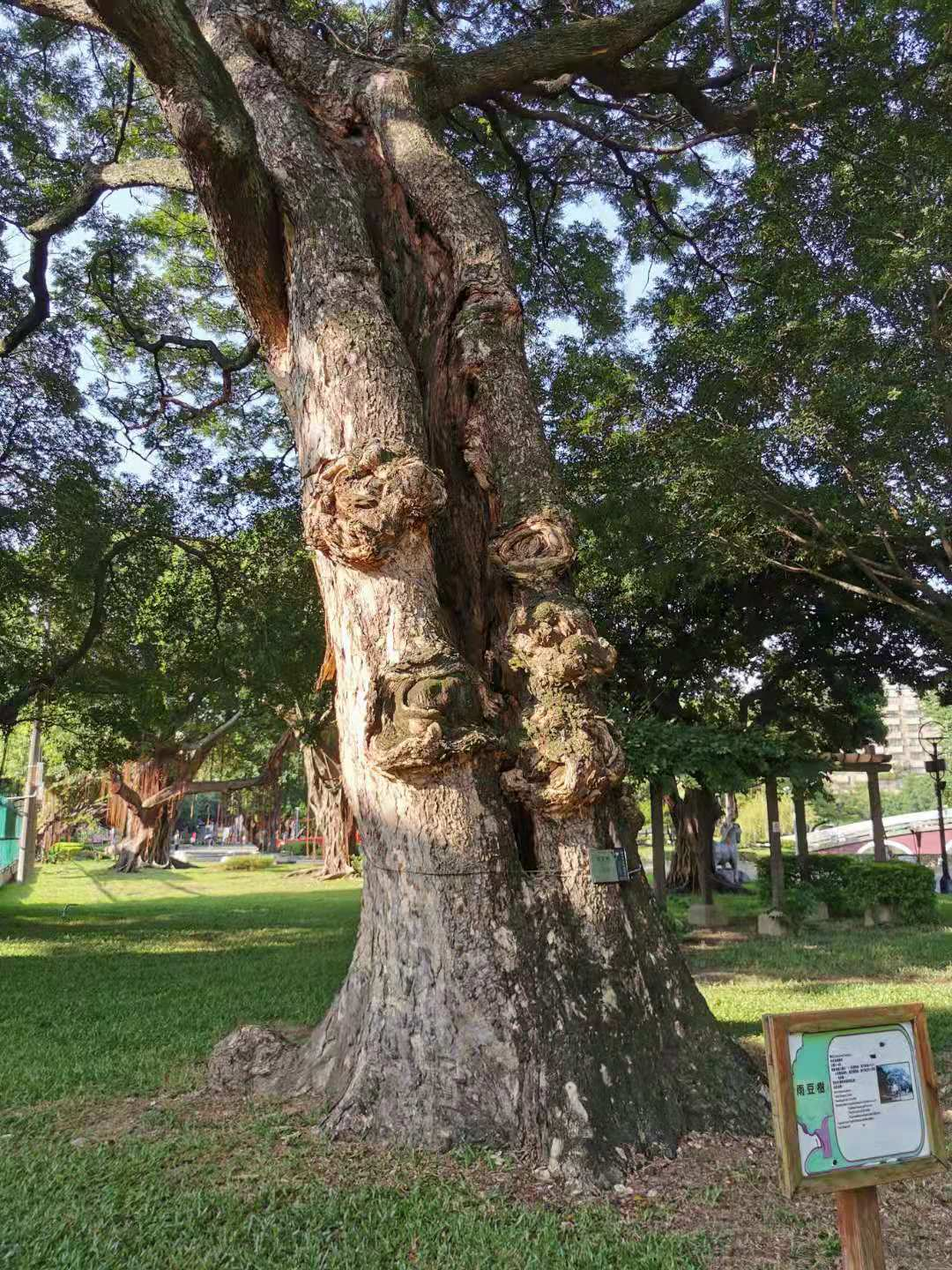
Burls on hollow trunk, Samanea saman

== See also ==
- Canker
- Forest pathology
- Gall
- Guksi
