= Stairs =

Construction that bridges a large vertical distance with steps

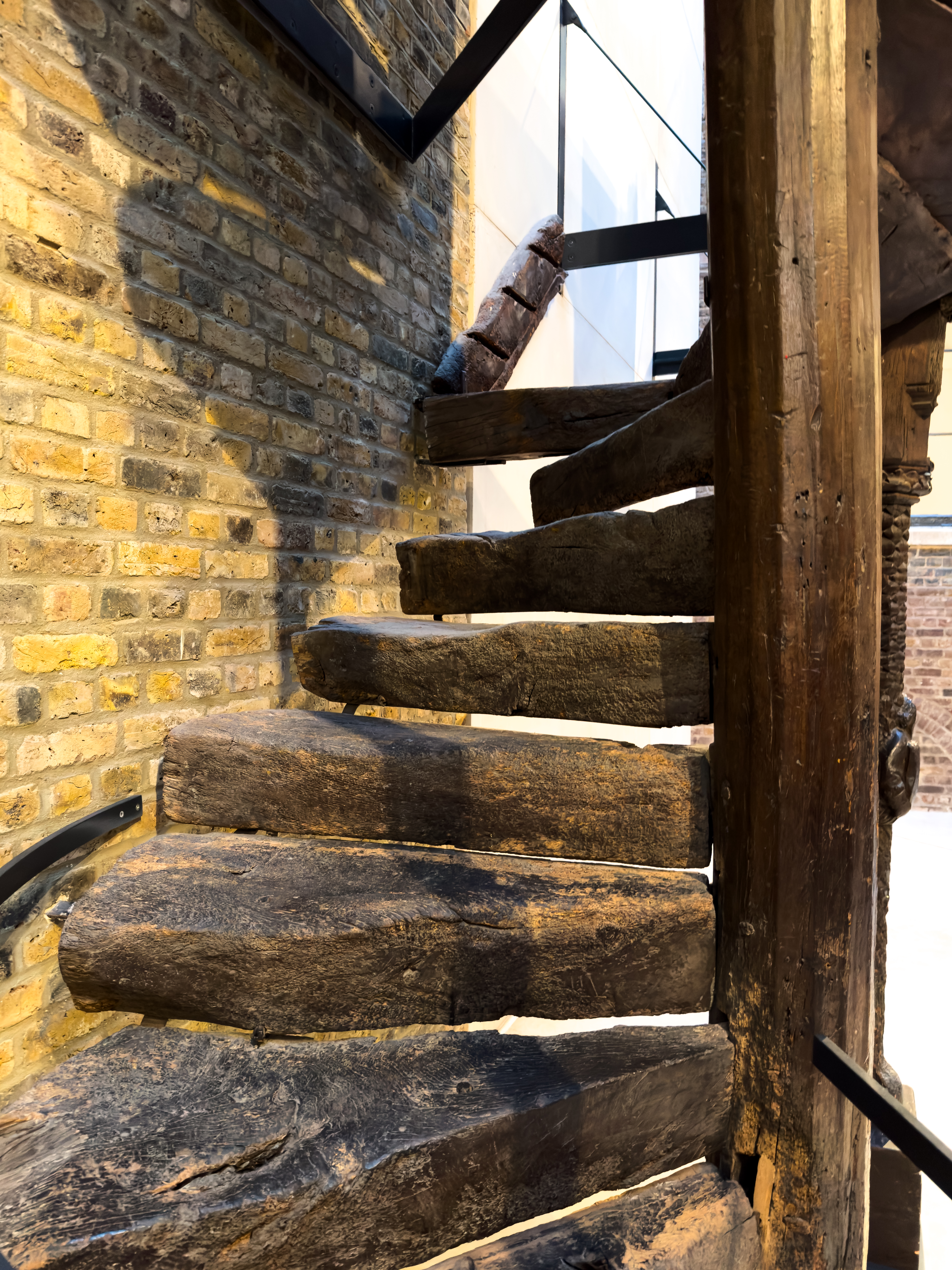
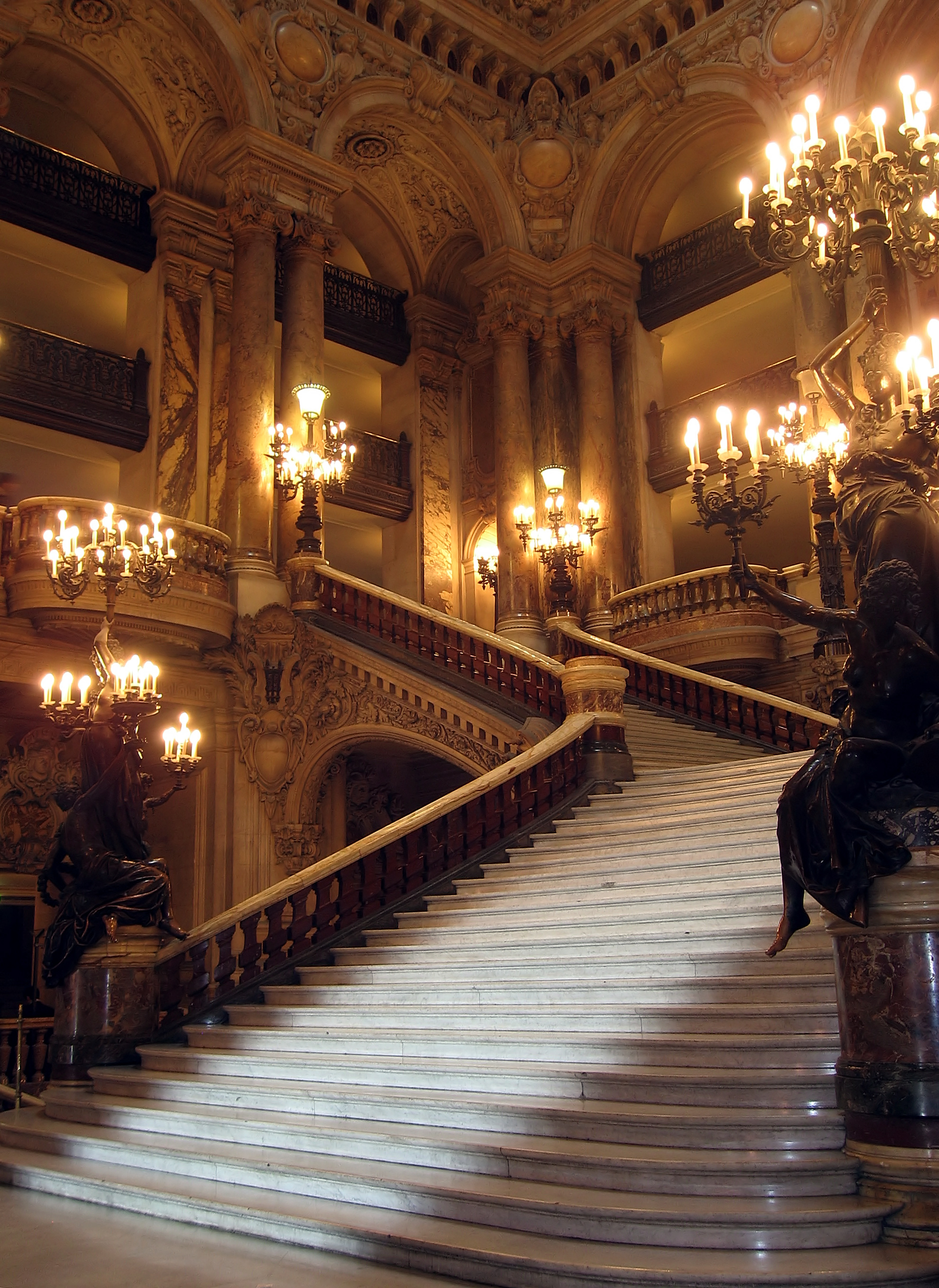
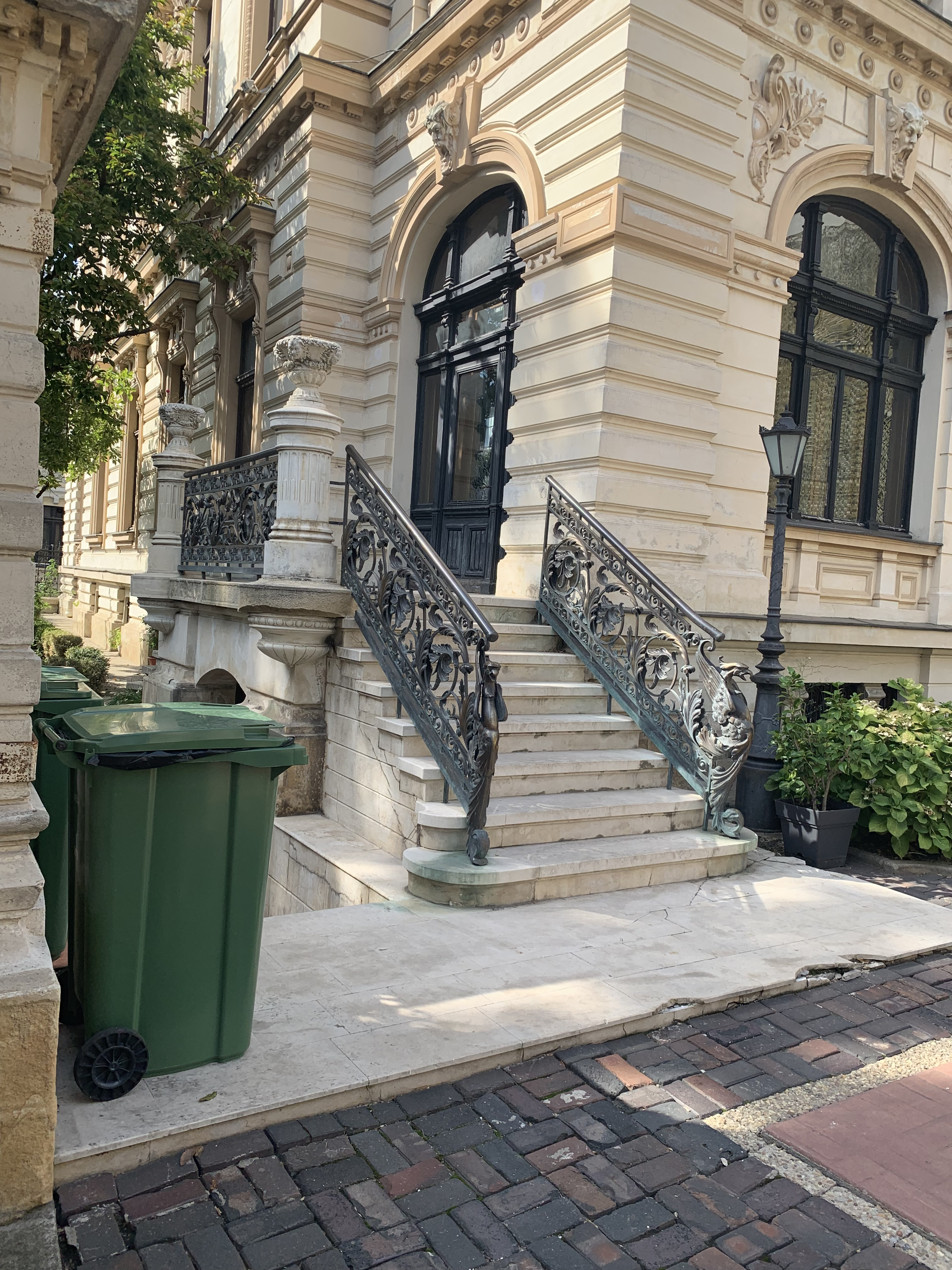
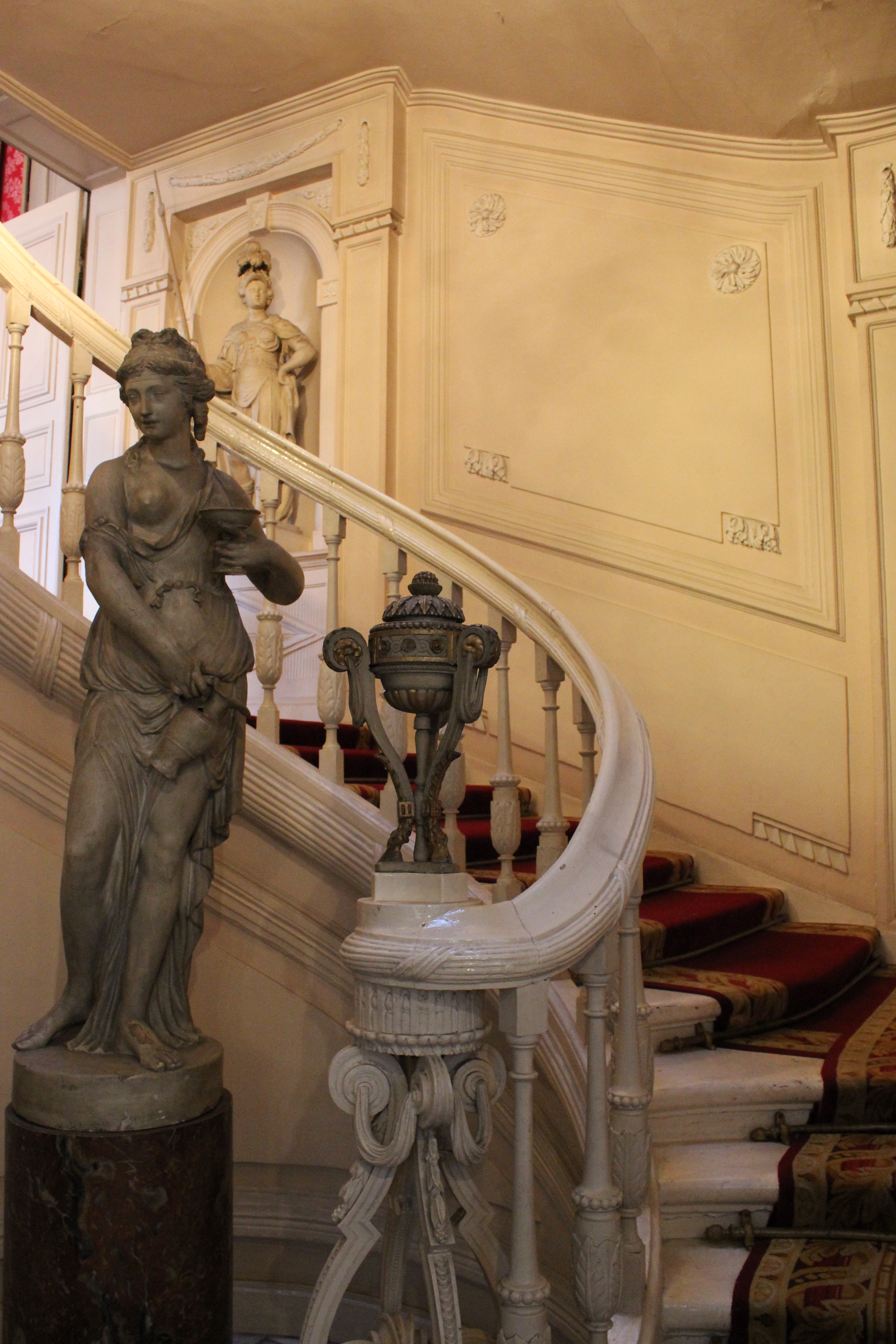
Various examples of stairs

Stairs are a structure designed to bridge a large vertical distance between lower and higher levels by dividing it into smaller vertical distances. This is achieved as a diagonal series of horizontal platforms called steps which enable passage to the other level by stepping from one to another step in turn. Steps are very typically rectangular, but may instead be straight, curved, or may consist of two or more straight pieces connected at angles.

Types of stairs include staircases (also called stairways) and escalators. Some alternatives to stairs are elevators (also called lifts), stairlifts, inclined moving walkways, ladders, and ramps. A stairwell is a vertical shaft or opening that contains a staircase. A flight (of stairs) is an inclined part of a staircase consisting of steps (and their lateral supports if supports are separate from steps).

== History ==
This is an excerpt from Staircase.

The concept of stairs is believed to be 8000 years old, and is one of the oldest structures in architectural history. The oldest example of spiral stairs dates back to the 400s BC. Medieval architecture saw experimentation with many different shapes, and the Renaissance even more so with varied designs.

Due to the simplicity of the design, stairs themselves can't be credited to one culture, and patterns in nature may also be confused, such as basalt columns or other natural formations. The creation of stairs came from the necessity to travel steep passages, and thus, the designs of many steep passages have been found in civilizations in Africa, America, and Asia, though the classifications of some are still subject to review.

== Components and terms ==
A stair, or a stairstep, is one step in a flight of stairs. A staircase or stairway is one or more flights of stairs leading from one floor to another, and includes landings, newel posts, handrails, balustrades, and additional parts.

In buildings, stairs is a term applied to a complete flight of steps between two floors. A stair flight is a run of stairs or steps between landings. A stairwell is a compartment extending vertically through a building in which stairs are placed. A stair hall is the stairs, landings, hallways, or other portions of the public hall through which it is necessary to pass when going from the entrance floor to the other floors of a building. Box stairs are stairs built between walls, usually with no support except the wall strings.

Stairs may be in a "straight run", leading from one floor to another without a turn or change in direction. Stairs may change direction, commonly by two straight flights connected at a 90° angle landing. Stairs may also return onto themselves with 180° angle landings at each end of straight flights forming a vertical stairway commonly used in multistory and high-rise buildings. Many variations of geometrical stairs may be formed of circular, elliptical and irregular constructions.

Ascending a set of stairs to a higher floor is often referred to as going "upstairs", the opposite being "downstairs". The same words can also be used to mean the upper or lower floors of a building, respectively.

=== Steps ===
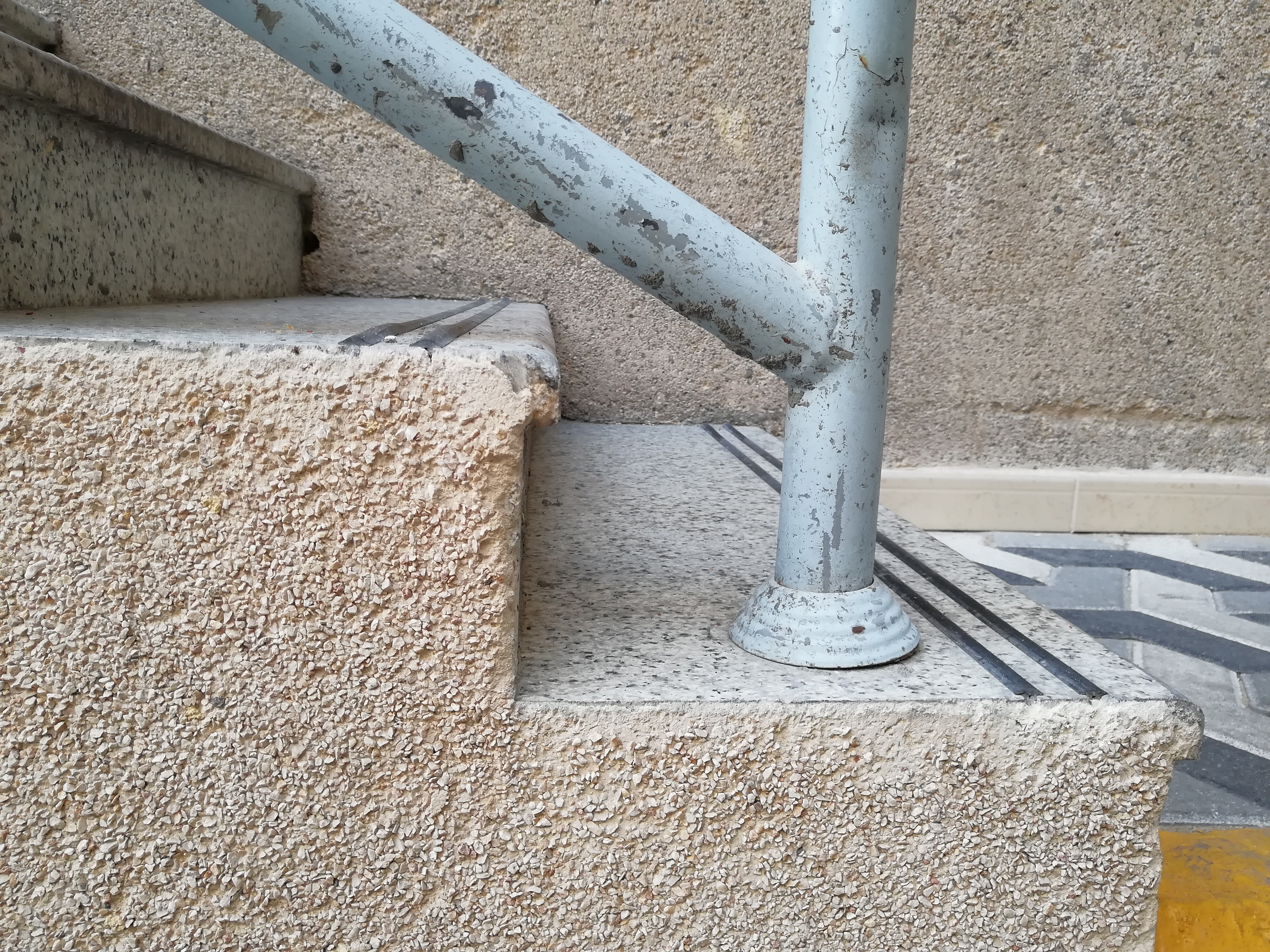
Steps with two anti-slip rubber strips and small nosings

Each step is composed of a tread and a riser. Some treads may include a nosing.

- Tread: The part of the stairway that is stepped on. It is constructed to the same specifications (thickness) as any other flooring. The tread "depth" is measured from the back of one tread to the back of the next. The "width" is measured from one side to the other.
- Riser: The near-vertical element in a set of stairs, forming the space between one step and the next. It is sometimes slightly inclined from the vertical so that its top is closer than its base to the person climbing the stairs. If a physical riser is not present, the design is described as "open riser". This is often the case in unfinished basements.
- Nosing: An edge part of the tread that protrudes over the riser beneath. If it is present, this means that, measured horizontally, the total "run" length of the stairs is not simply the sum of the tread lengths, as the treads overlap each other. Some building codes require stair nosings in specific cases where the tread depth is below a minimum value. They provide additional length to the tread without changing the pitch of the stairs.
- Starting or feature tread: Where stairs are open on one or both sides, the first step above the lower floor or landing may be wider than the other steps and rounded. When the starting step is rounded, the balusters typically are arranged in a true spiral around the circumference of the rounded portion, and the handrail has a flat spiral called a "volute" that connects the tops of the balusters. Besides the cosmetic appeal, starting steps allow the balusters to form a wider, more stable base for the end of the handrail. Handrails that simply end at a post at the foot of the stairs can be less sturdy, even with a thick post. A double-ended feature tread can be used when both sides of the stairs are open. There are a number of different styles and uses of feature tread.
- Stringer board, stringer, or sometimes just string: The structural member that supports the treads and risers in standard staircases. There are typically three stringers, one on either side and one in the center, with more added as necessary for wider spans. Side stringers are sometimes dadoed to receive risers and treads for increased support. Stringers on open-sided stairs are called "cut stringers".
- Tread rise: The distance from the top of one tread to the top of the next tread.
- Total rise: The distance the flight of stairs raises vertically between two finished floor levels.
- Winders: Winders are steps that are narrower on one side than the other. They are used to change the direction of the stairs without landings. A series of winders form a circular or helical stairway. When three steps are used to turn a 90° corner, the middle step is called a kite winder as a kite-shaped quadrilateral.
- Trim: Various moldings are used to decorate and in some instances support stairway elements. Scotia or quarter-round are typically placed beneath the nosing to support its overhang.
- Curtail step: A decorative step at the bottom of a staircase that usually houses the volute and volute newel turning for a continuous handrail. The curtail tread will follow the flow of the volute.

=== Handrails ===
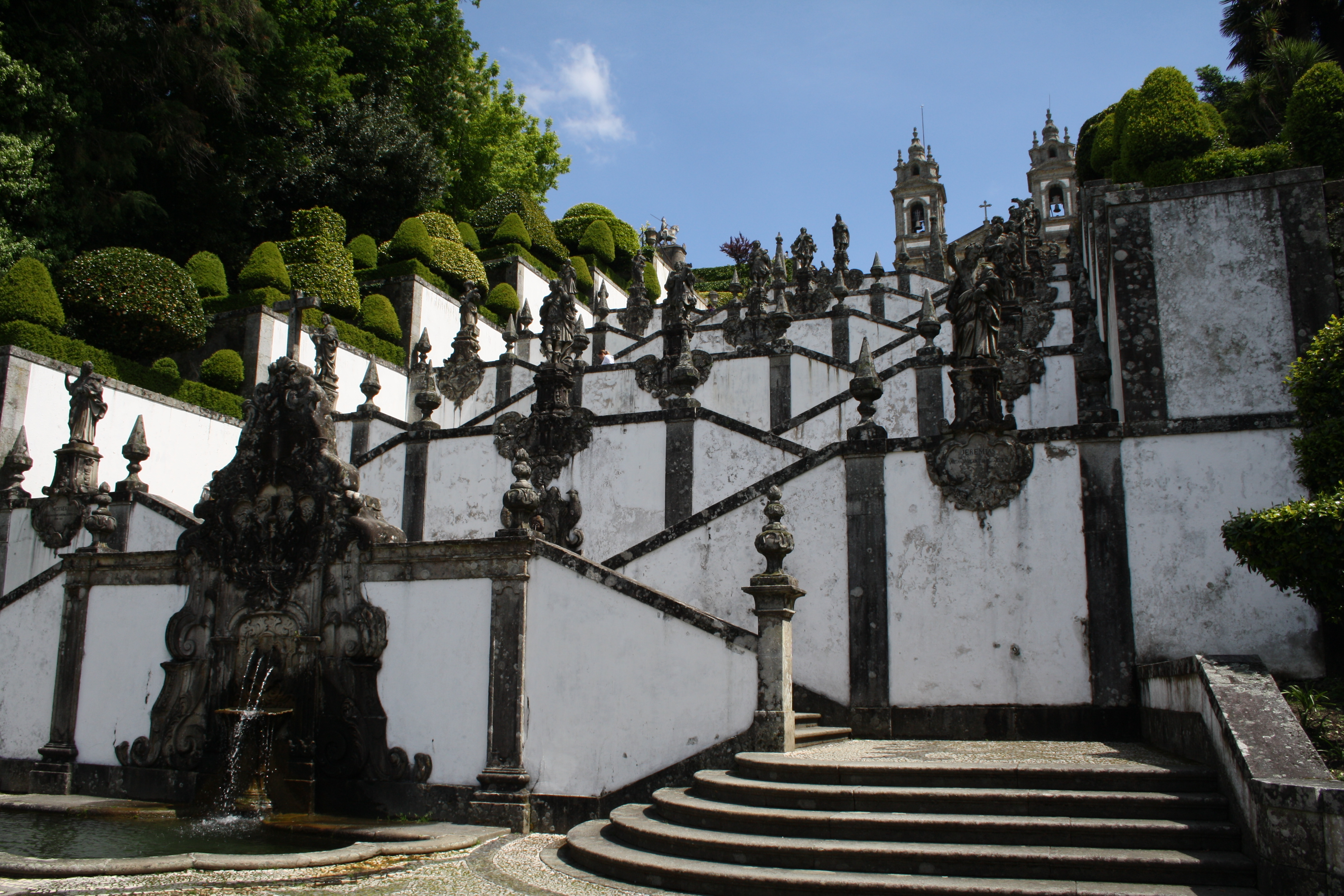
Neo-Baroque stairs with simple stone balustrade

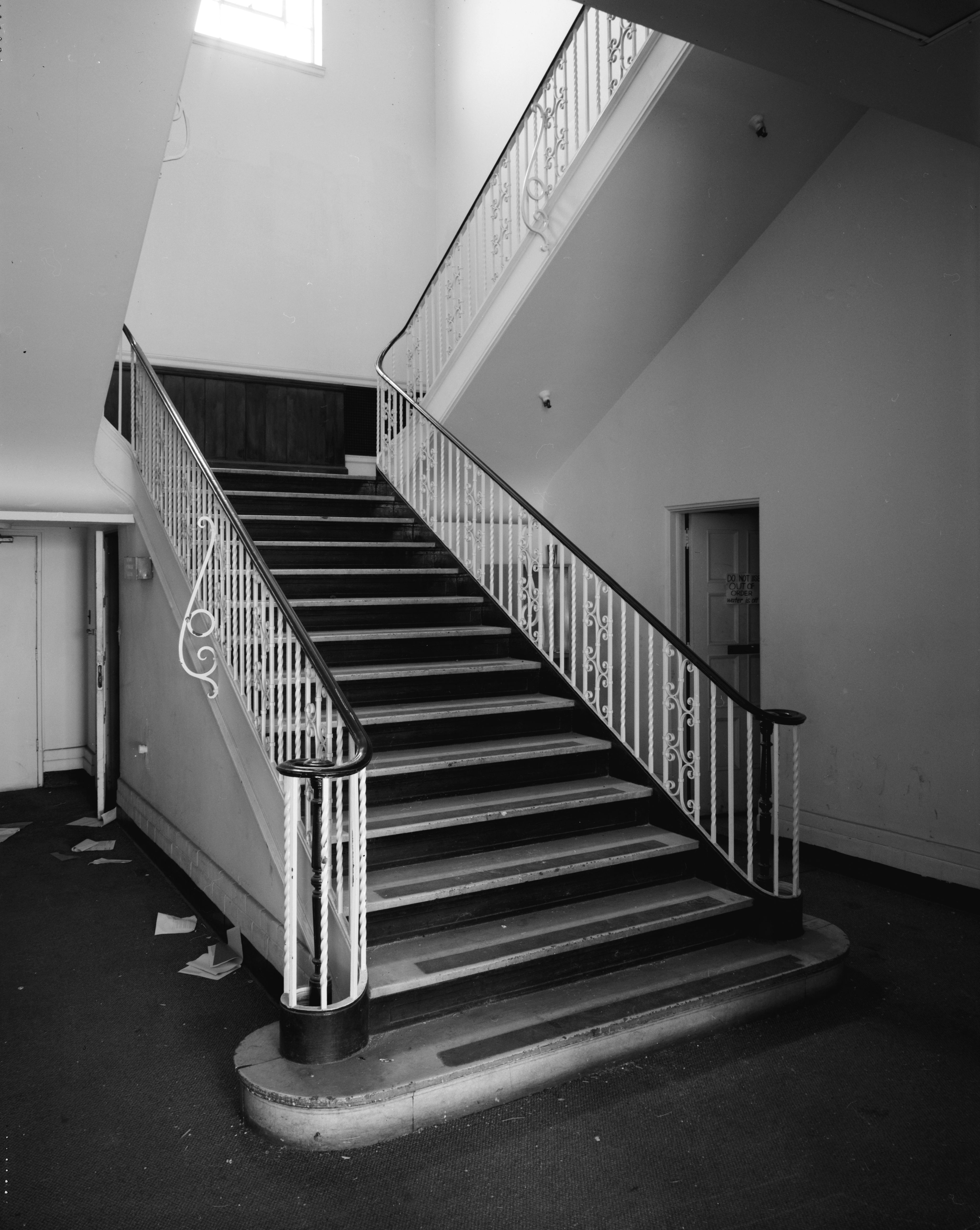
Staircase with double bullnose and two volutes. An intermediate landing is part of this U-shaped stair.

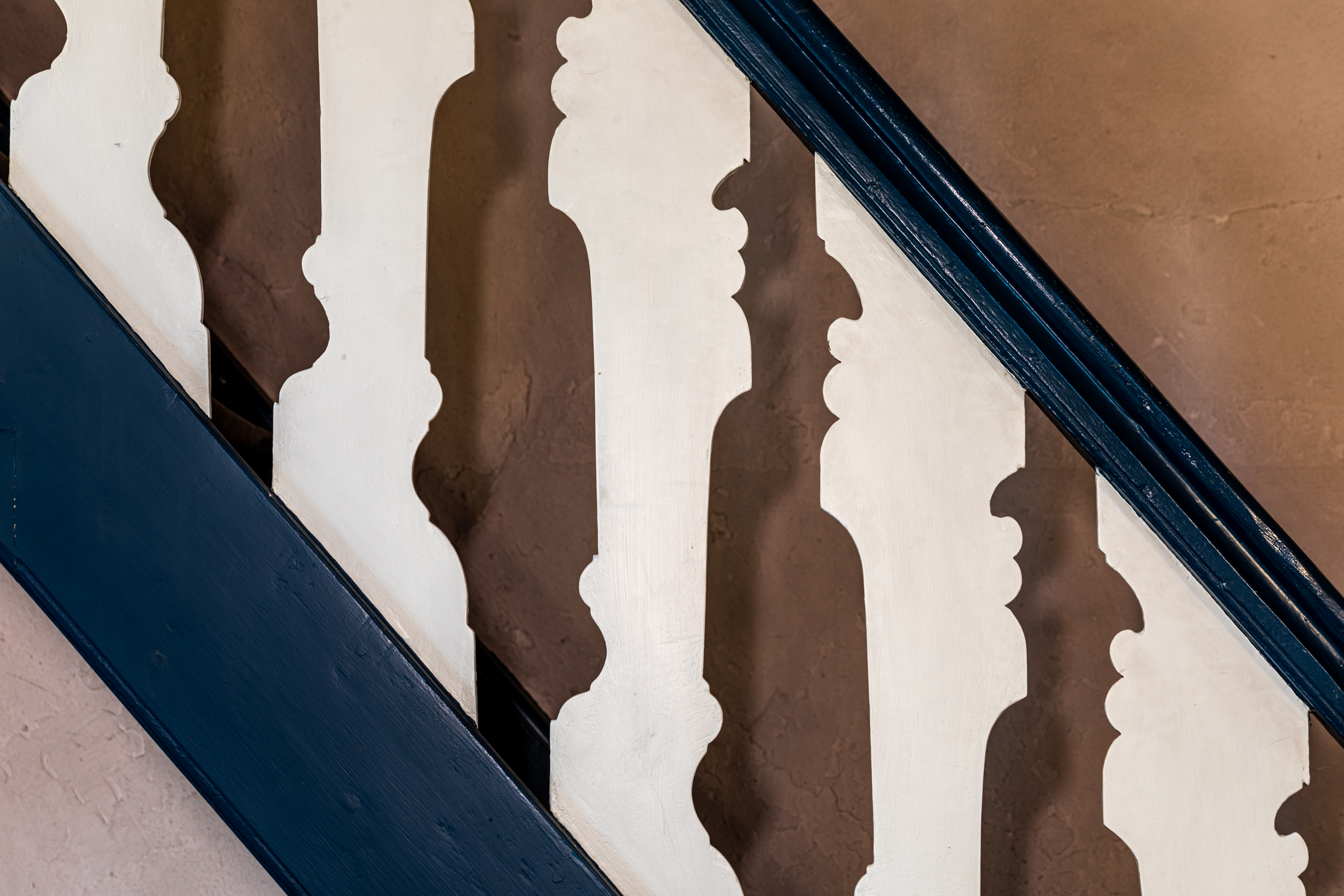
Handrail and carved balusters

The balustrade is the system of railings and balusters that prevents people from falling over the edge.

- Banister, railing, or handrail: The angled member for hand holding, as distinguished from the vertical balusters which hold it up for stairs that are open on one side. Railings are often present on both sides of stairs, but can sometimes be only on one side or absent altogether. On wide staircases, there can be one or more railings between the two sides. The term "banister" is sometimes used to mean just the handrail, sometimes the handrail and the balusters, or sometimes just the balusters.
- Volute: A handrail end element for the bullnose step that curves inward like a spiral. A volute is said to be right or left-handed depending on which side of the stairs the handrail is as one faces up the stairs.
- Turnout: Instead of a complete spiral volute, a turnout deviates from the normal handrail center line away from the flight to give a wider opening as one enters the staircase, The turnout is usually set over a newel post to give added stability to the handrail.
- Gooseneck: The vertical handrail that joins a sloped handrail to a higher handrail on the balcony or landing is a gooseneck.
- Rosette: Where the handrail ends in the wall and a half-newel is not used, it may be trimmed by a rosette.
- Easings: Wall handrails are mounted directly onto the wall with wall brackets. At the bottom of the stairs, such railings flare to a horizontal railing and this horizontal portion is called a "starting easing". At the top of the stairs, the horizontal portion of the railing is called an "over easing".
- Core rail: Wood handrails often have a metal core to provide extra strength and stiffness, especially when the rail has to curve against the grain of the wood. The archaic term for the metal core is "core rail".
- Baluster: A term for the vertical posts that hold up the handrail. Sometimes simply called guards or spindles. Treads often require two balusters. The second baluster is closer to the riser and is taller than the first. The extra height in the second baluster is typically in the middle between decorative elements on the baluster. That way the bottom decorative elements are aligned with the tread and the top elements are aligned with the railing angle.

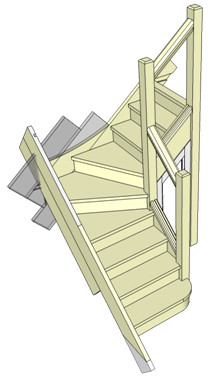
Winder stairs with a simple handrail supported by three newel posts

- Newel: A large baluster or post used to anchor the handrail. Since it is a structural element, it extends below the floor and subfloor to the bottom of the floor joists and is bolted right to the floor joist. A half-newel may be used where a railing ends in the wall. Visually, it looks like half the newel is embedded in the wall. For open landings, a newel may extend below the landing for a decorative newel drop.
- Finial: A decorative cap to the top of a newel post, particularly at the end of the balustrade.
- Baserail, or shoerail: For systems where the baluster does not start at the treads, they go to a baserail. This allows for identical balusters, avoiding the second baluster problem.
- Fillet: A decorative filler piece on the floor between balusters on a balcony railing.

Handrails may be continuous (sometimes called over-the-post) or post-to-post (or more accurately newel-to-newel). For continuous handrails on long balconies, there may be multiple newels and tandem caps to cover the newels. At corners, there are quarter-turn caps. For post-to-post systems, the newels project above the handrails.

Another, more classical, form of handrailing that is still in use is the tangent method. A variant of the cylindric method of layout, it allows for continuous climbing and twisting rails and easings. It was defined from principles set down by architect Peter Nicholson in the 18th century.

=== Other terms ===
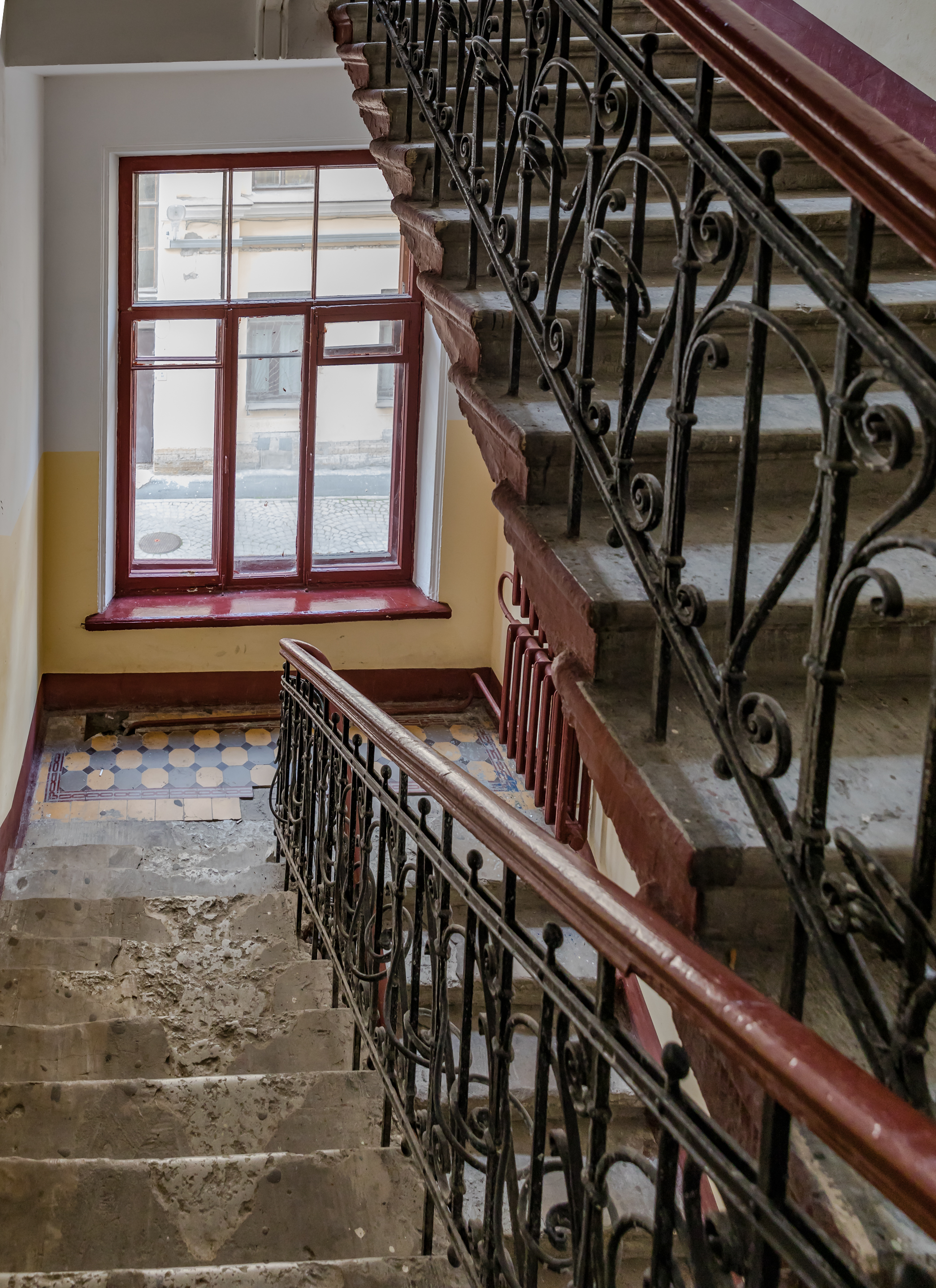
Two flights of stairs joined by a landing

- Flight: Any uninterrupted series of steps between floors or levels.
- Landing, or platform: A landing is the area of a floor near the top or bottom step of a stair. An intermediate landing is a small platform that is built as part of stairs between main floor levels and is typically used to allow the stairs to change directions, or to allow the user a rest. A half landing, or half-pace, is where a 180° change in direction is made, and a quarter landing is where a 90° change in direction is made (on an intermediate landing). As intermediate landings consume floor space, they can be expensive to build. However, changing the direction of the stairs allows stairs to fit where they would not otherwise, or provides privacy to the upper level as visitors downstairs cannot simply look up the stairs to the upper level due to the change in direction. The word 'landing' is also commonly used for a general corridor in any of the floors above the ground floor of a building, even if that corridor is located well away from a staircase.
- Apron: This is a wooden fascia board used to cover up trimmers and joists exposed by stairwell openings. The apron may be moulded or plain, and is intended to give the staircase a cleaner look by cloaking the side view.
- Balcony: For stairs with an open concept upper floor or landing, the upper floor is functionally a balcony. For a straight flight of stairs, the balcony may be long enough to require multiple newels to support the length of railing.

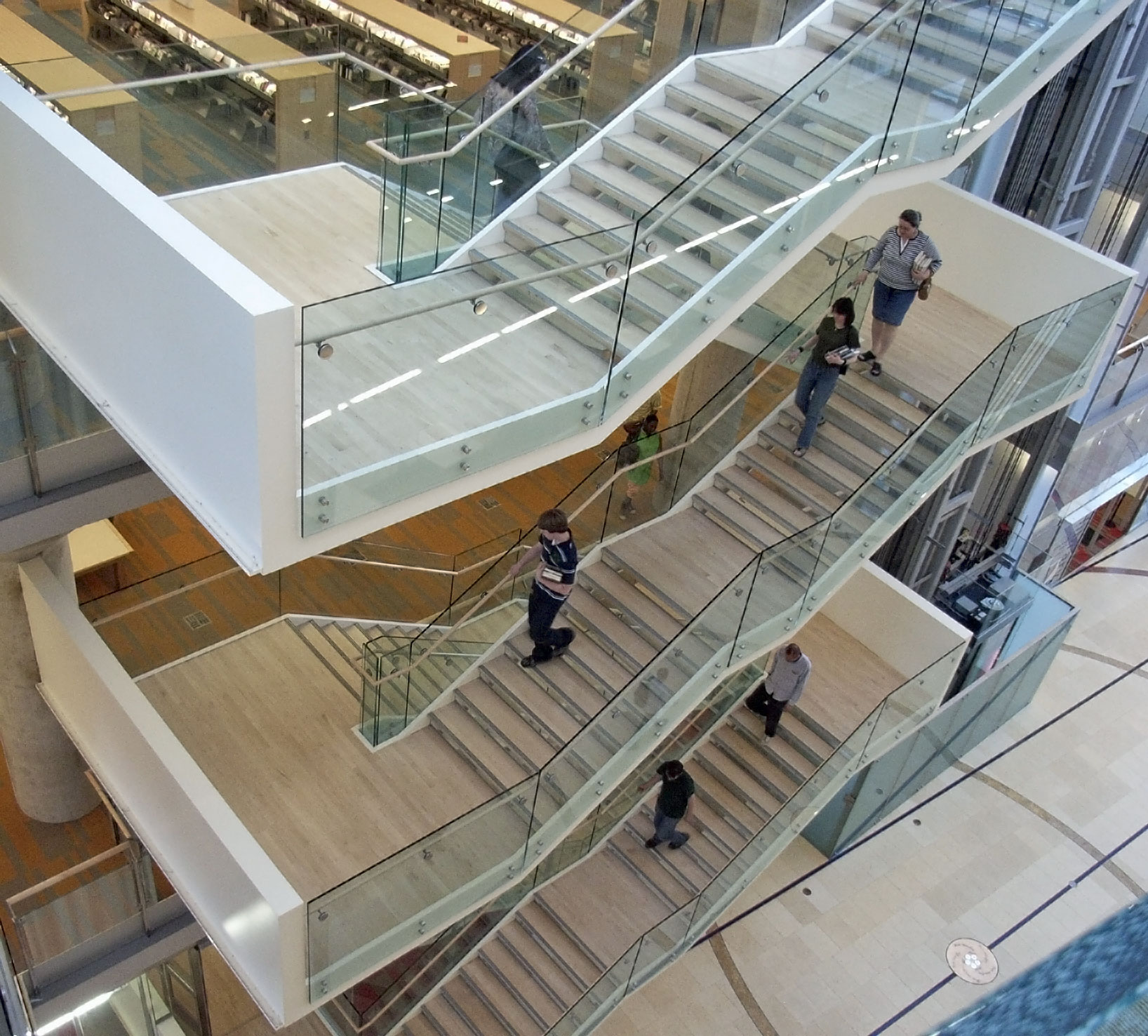
Floating staircase

- Floating stairs: A flight of stairs is said to be "floating" if there is nothing underneath. The risers are typically missing as well to emphasize the open effect, and create a functional feature suspended in midair. There may be only one stringer or the stringers otherwise minimized. Where building codes allow, there may not even be handrails.
- Mobile safety steps: Can be used as temporary, safe replacements for many types of stairs
- Runner: Carpeting that runs down the middle of the stairs. Runners may be directly stapled or nailed to the stairs, or may be secured by a specialized bar, known as a stair rod, that holds the carpet in place where the tread meets the riser.
- Spandrel: If there is not another flight of stairs immediately underneath, the triangular space underneath the stairs is called a "spandrel". It is frequently used as a closet.
- Stairwell: The spatial opening, usually a vertical shaft, containing an indoor stairway; by extension, it is often used to include the stairs it contains.
- Staircase tower: A tower attached to, or incorporated into, a building that contains stairs linking the various floors.

=== Dimensions ===
A diagram showing the measurements that can be taken from a staircase

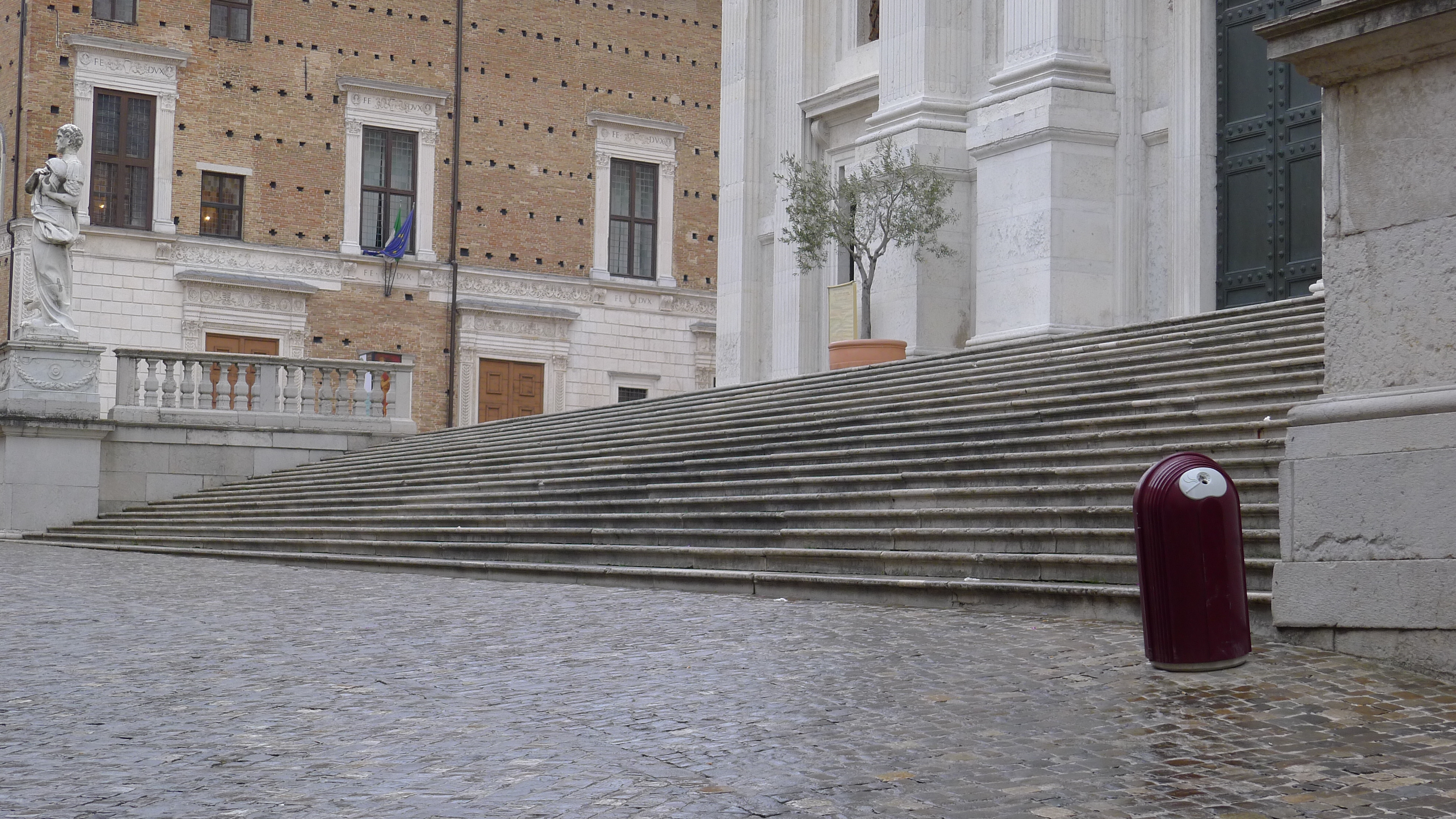
A quite unusual "variable rise" stairway, which also distorts visual perspective (at The Duomo in Urbino, Italy)

The dimensions of a stair, in particular the rise height and going of the steps, should remain the same along the stairs.

The following stair dimensions are important:

- The rise height or rise of each step is measured from the top of one tread to the next. It is not the physical height of the riser; the latter excludes the thickness of the tread. A person using the stairs would move this distance vertically for each step taken.
- The tread depth of a step is measured from the edge of the nosing to the vertical riser; if the steps have no nosing, it is the same as the going; otherwise it is the going plus the extent of one nosing.
- The going of a step is measured from the edge of the nosing to the edge of nosing in plan view. A person using the stairs would move this distance forward with each step they take.
- To avoid confusion, the number of steps in a set of stairs is always the number of risers, not the number of treads.
- The total run or total going of the stairs is the horizontal distance from the first riser to the last riser. It is often not simply the sum of the individual tread lengths due to the nosing overlapping between treads. If there are N steps, the total run equals N-1 times the going: the tread of the first step is part of a landing.
- The total rise of the stairs is the height between floors (or landings) that the flight of stairs is spanning. If there are N steps, the total rise equals N times the rise of each step.
- The slope or pitch of the stairs is the ratio between the rise and the going (not the tread depth, due to the nosing). It is sometimes called the rake of the stairs. The pitch line is the imaginary line along the tip of the nosing of the treads. In the UK, stair pitch is the angle the pitch line makes with the horizontal, measured in degrees. The value of the slope, as a ratio, is then the tangent of the pitch angle.
- Headroom is the height above the nosing of a tread to the ceiling above it.
- Walkline – for curved stairs, the inner radius of the curve may result in very narrow treads. The "walkline" is the imaginary line some distance away from the inner edge on which people are expected to walk. The building code will specify the distance. Building codes will then specify the minimum tread size at the walkline.

== Forms ==
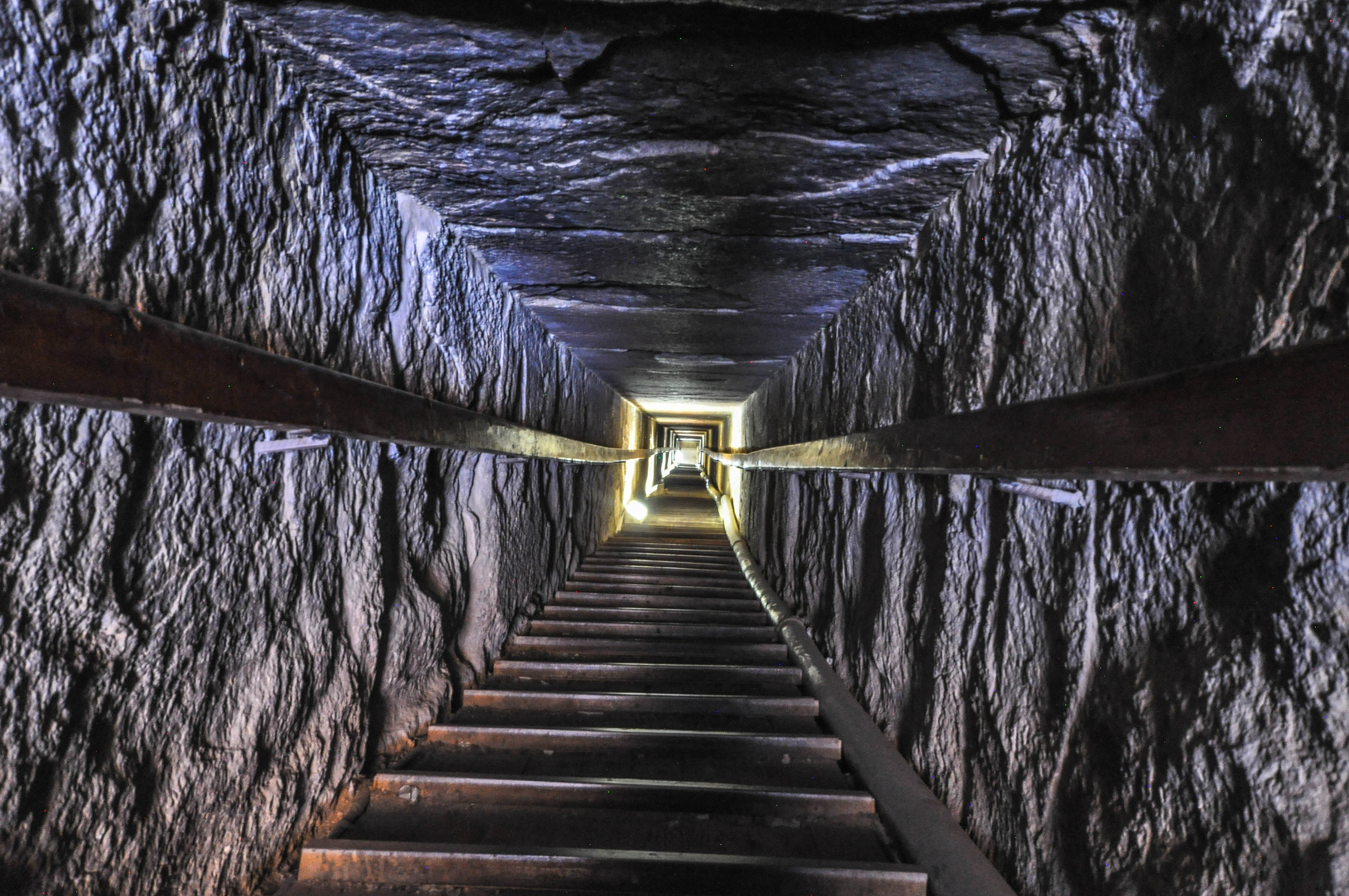
Stairs inside the Red Pyramid in Egypt, c. 2575–2551 BCE

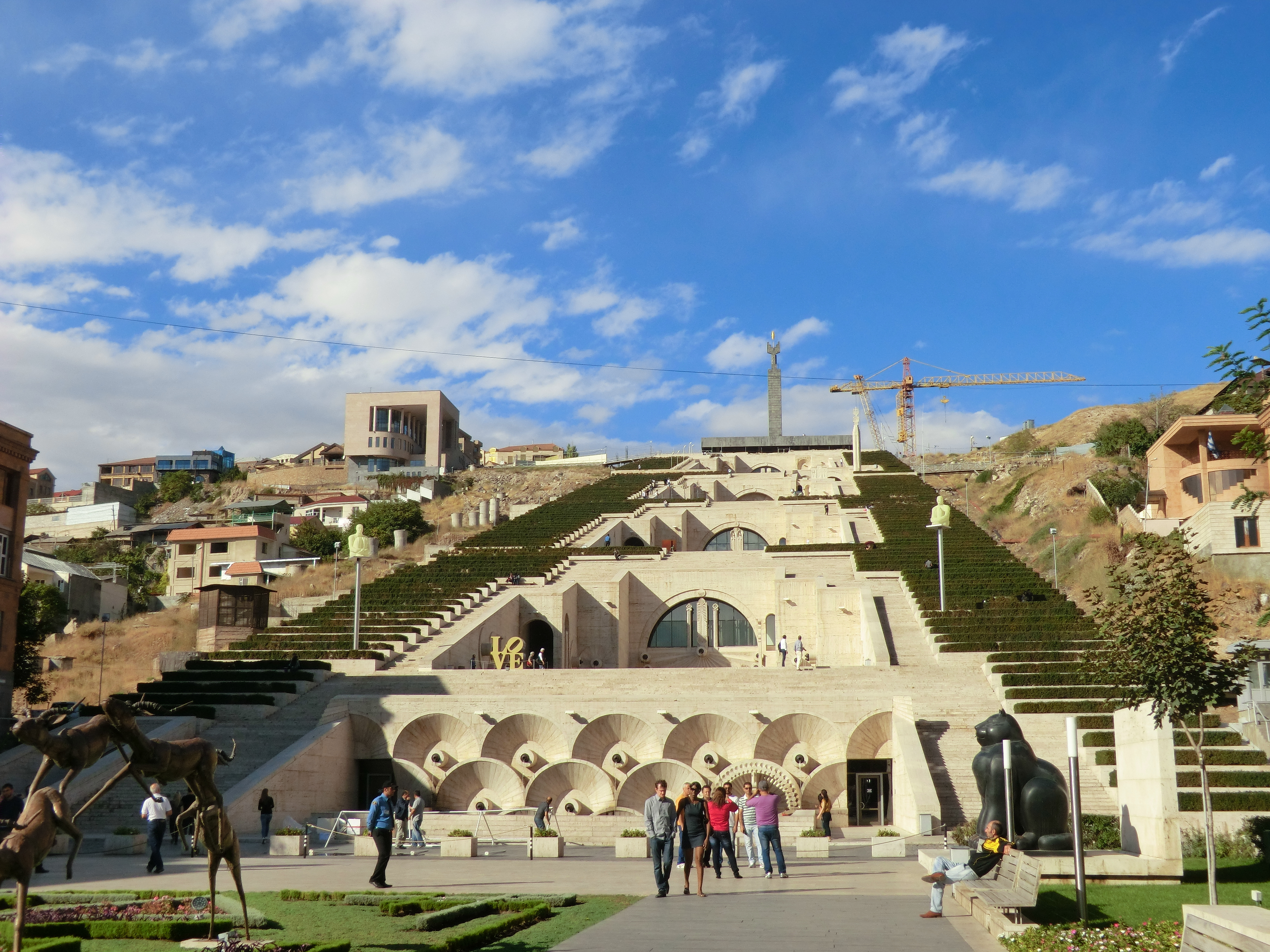
The Cascade of Yerevan, a giant stairway made of limestone in Armenia

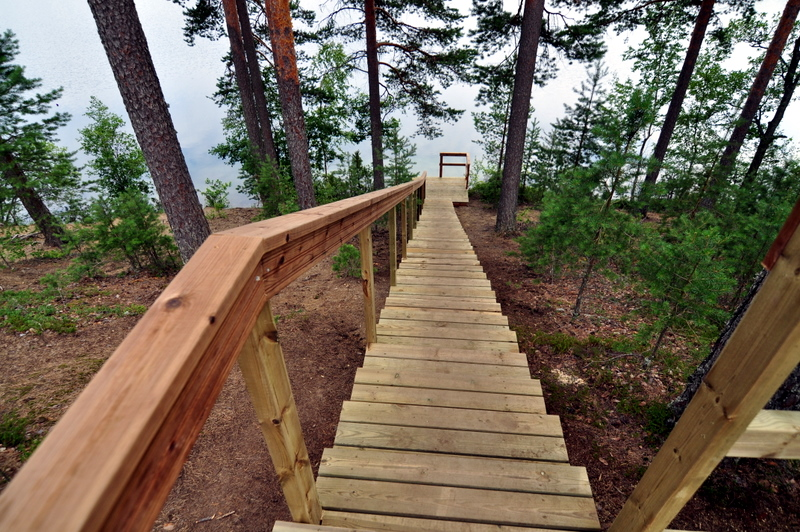
Wooden stairs at the shores of Lake Iso-Melkutin in Loppi, Finland

Stairs can take a large number of forms, combining straight runs, winders, and landings.

The simplest form is the straight flight of stairs, with neither winders nor landings. These types of stairs were commonly used in traditional homes, as they are relatively easy to build and only need to be connected at the top and bottom. However, many modern architects may not choose straight flights of stairs because:

- the upstairs is directly visible from the bottom of a straight flight of stairs
- it is potentially more dangerous in that a fall is not interrupted until the bottom of the stairs
- a straight flight requires enough straight length for the entire run of the stairs

Another form of a straight staircase is the "space saver staircase", also known as "paddle stairs" or "alternating tread staircases". These designs can be used for a steeper rise, but they can only be used in certain circumstances, and must comply with regulations.

However, a basic straight flight of stairs is easier to design and construct than one with landings or winders. The rhythm of stepping is not interrupted in a straight run, which may offset an increased fall risk by helping to prevent a misstep in the first place. However, many long straight runs of stairs will require landings or winders to comply with safety standards in building regulations.

Straight stairs can have a mid-landing incorporated, but it is probably more common to see stairs that use a landing or winder to produce a bend in the stairs. A straight flight with a mid-landing will require a lot of straight length, and may be more commonly found in large commercial buildings. L-shaped stairways have one landing and usually a change in direction by 90°. U-shaped stairs may employ a single wider landing for a change in direction of 180°, or two landings for two changes in direction of 90° each. A Z-shaped staircase incorporates two opposite 90° turns, creating a shape similar to that of the letter "Z" if seen from above. The use of landings and a possible change of direction have the following effects:

- The upstairs is not directly visible from the bottom of the stairs, which can provide more privacy for the upper floor
- A fall can be halted at the landing point, reducing the total distance and potential injury
- Though the landings consume more total floor space, there is no requirement for a single lengthy run, allowing more flexible floor plan designs
- For larger stairs, particularly in exterior applications, a landing can provide a place for pedestrians to rest their legs

Other forms include stairs with winders that curve or bend at an acute angle, three flights of stairs that join at a landing to form a T-shape, and stairs with balconies and complex designs.

A "mono string" staircase is a term used for a staircase with treads arranged along a single steel beam. A "double string" staircase has two steel beams, one on either side, and treads spanning between.

== Helical stairs ==
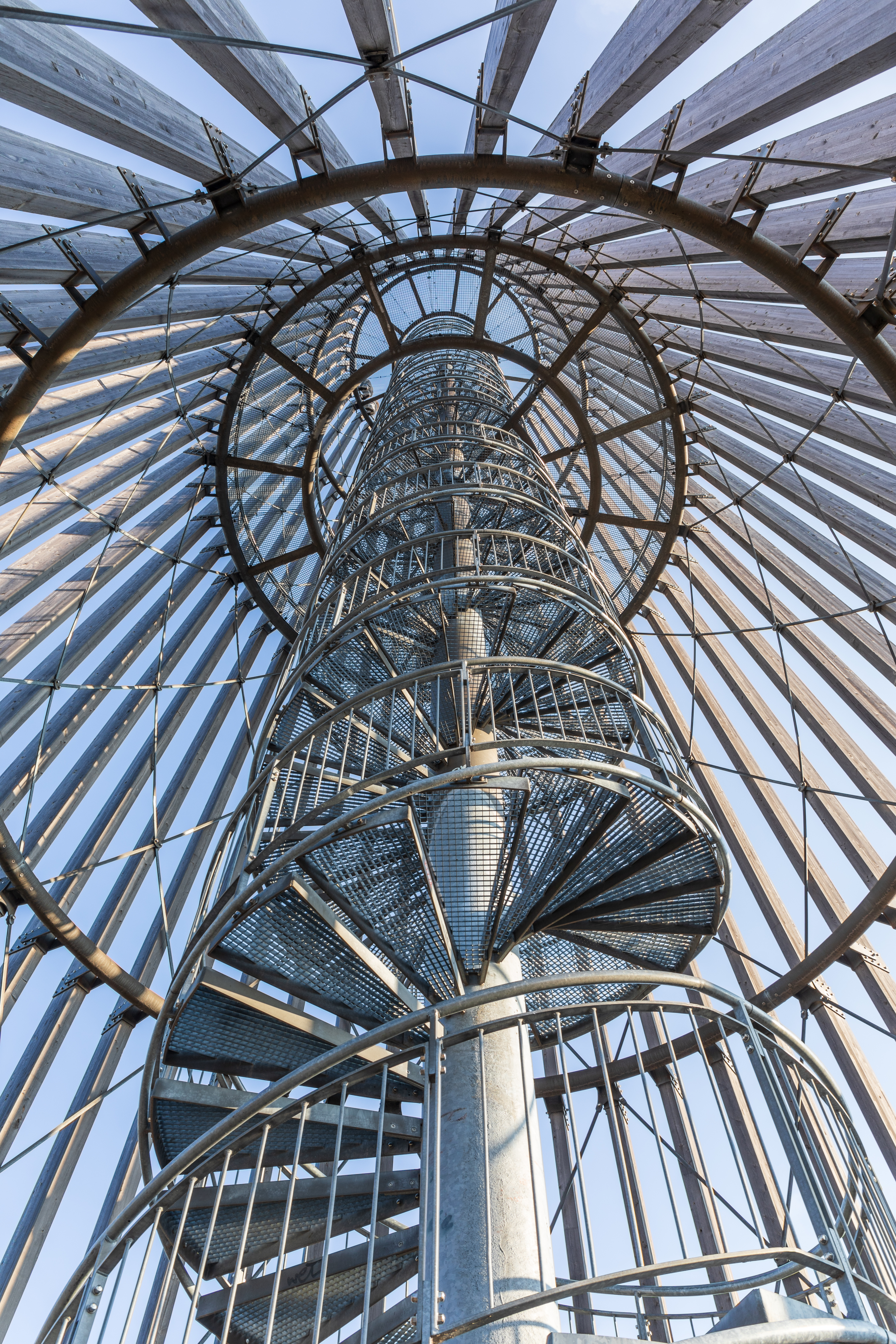
This stair tower displays the classic helical shape (Austria)

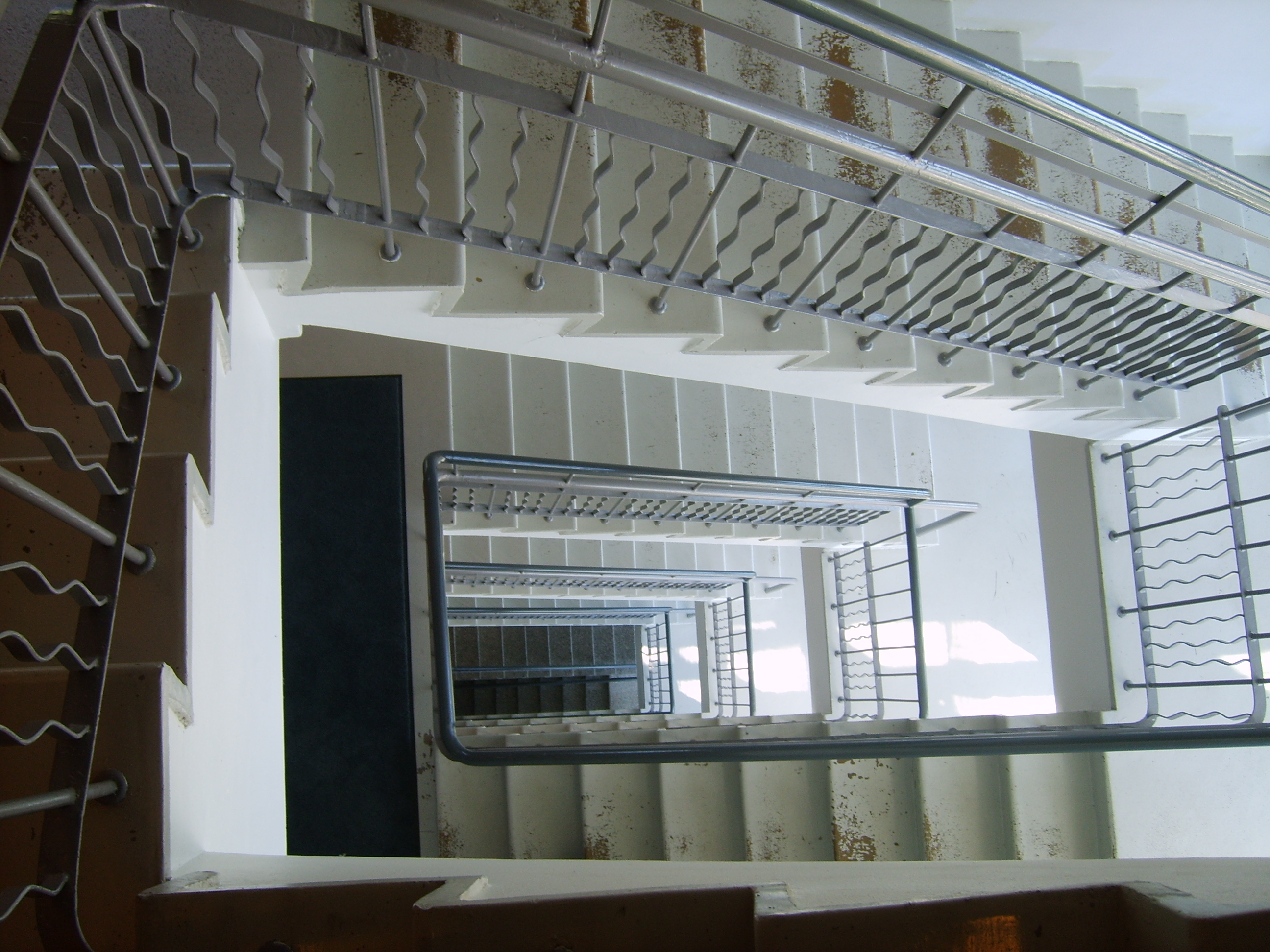
This multi-flight "squared helix" stairway has landings where people can pause to rest (Jyväskylä, Finland)

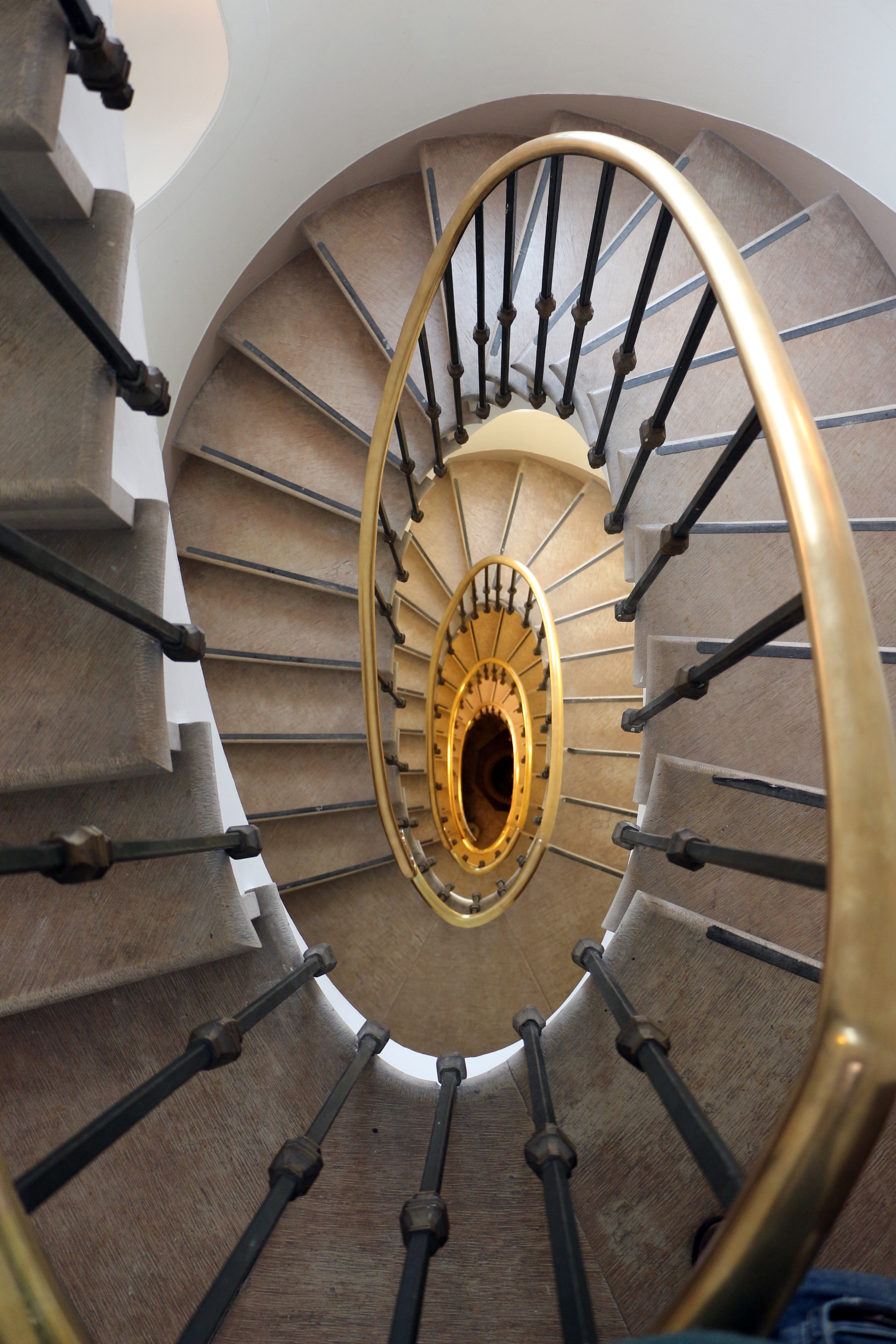
Tomaso Buzzi's design for the Palazzo Loredan Cini, Venice

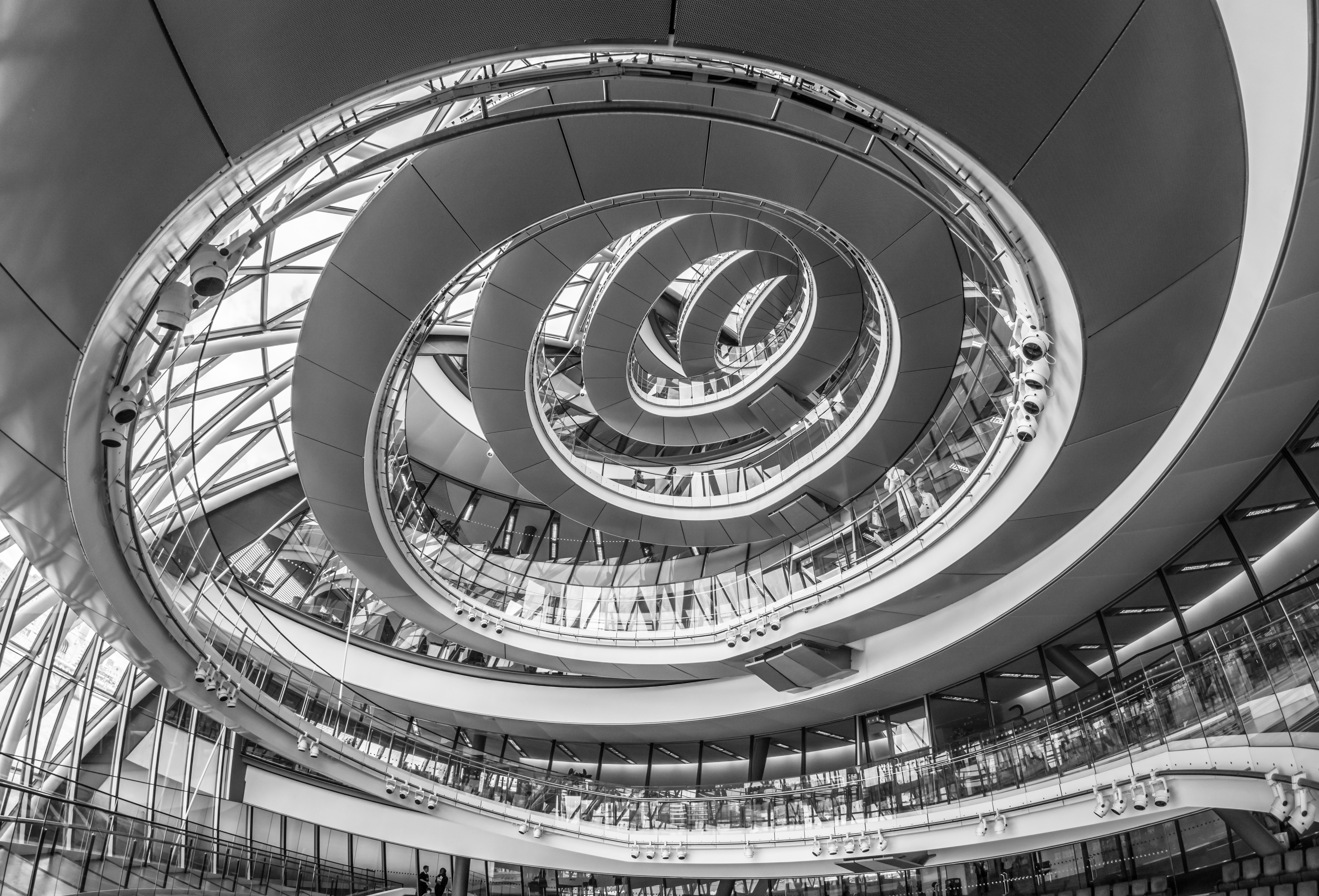
Hybrid helical spiral staircase in a former London City Hall

=== Terminology ===
Comparison of spiral (blue), helix (green), and a conical helix (red) derived from both curves

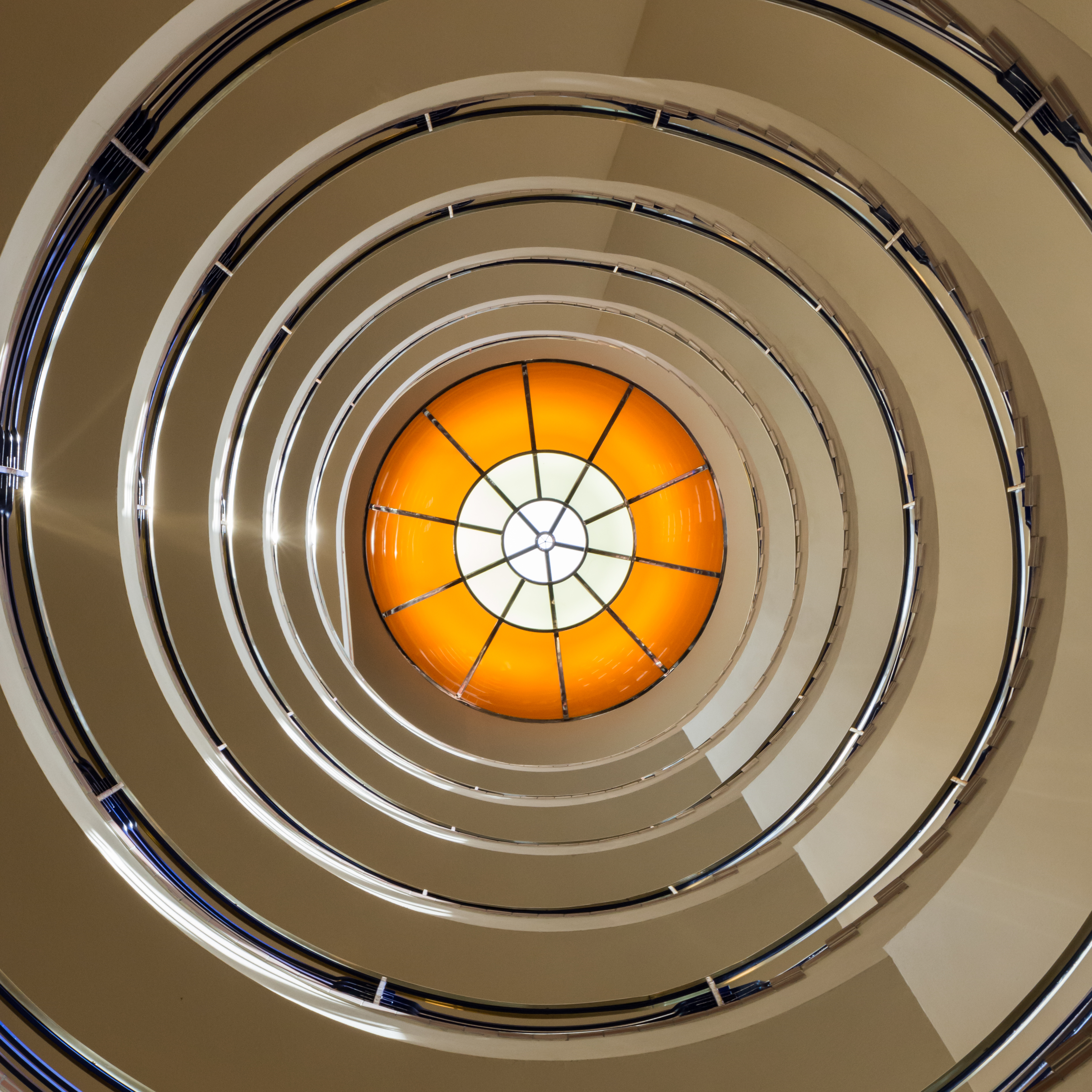
Perspective foreshortening flattens this upward view of an open-well helical stairway into the appearance of a hyperbolic spiral (Hamburg, Germany)

The term "helical stair" has many synonyms:

The helical stair is also called the spiral stair, winding stair, circular stair, elliptical stair, oval stair, geometric stair, vis, vice, vis de Saint Gilles, St. Gilles screw, belfry stair, turret stair, caracole, turnpike, cochlea, cockle, corkscrew, and ascensorium. Helical is possibly the least poetic but also the most accurate generic title.

— John Templer, The Staircase: History and Theories (1992)

The term "spiral" has a more narrow definition in a mathematical context, as a curve which lies in a single plane and moves towards or away from a central point, with a continuously changing radius. The mathematical term for the 3-dimensional curve traced where the locus progresses at a fixed radius from a fixed line while moving in a circular motion around it is a "helix". Since the very purpose of a stairway is to change elevation, it is inherently a 3-dimensional path.

Loose everyday usage conflates the terms helical and spiral, but the vast majority of circular stairs are actually helical. True spiral staircases would be nonfunctional flat structures, although functional hybrid helical spiral staircases can be constructed. This article attempts to preferentially use the terms "helix" and "helical" to describe circular stairways more clearly and precisely, while reserving the term "spiral" for a curve restricted to a flat plane.

Helical stairs, sometimes referred to in architectural descriptions as vice, wind around a newel (also called the "central pole"). The presence or absence of a central pole or newel does not affect the overall terminology applied to the design of the structure. In Scottish architecture, helical stairs are commonly known as a turnpike stair.

Helical stairs typically have a handrail along the outer periphery only, and on the inner side may have just a central pole. A "squared helical" stair fills a square stairwell and expands the steps and railing to a square, resulting in unequal steps (wider and longer where they extend into a corner of the square). A "pure helix" fills a circular stairwell, and has multiple steps and handrail elements which are identical and positioned screw-symmetrically.

Helical stairs have a handedness or chirality, analogous to the handedness of screw threads, either right-handed or left-handed helical shapes. Ascending a right-handed helix rises counter-clockwise, while ascending a left-handed helix rises clockwise (both as viewed from above).

=== Geometry ===
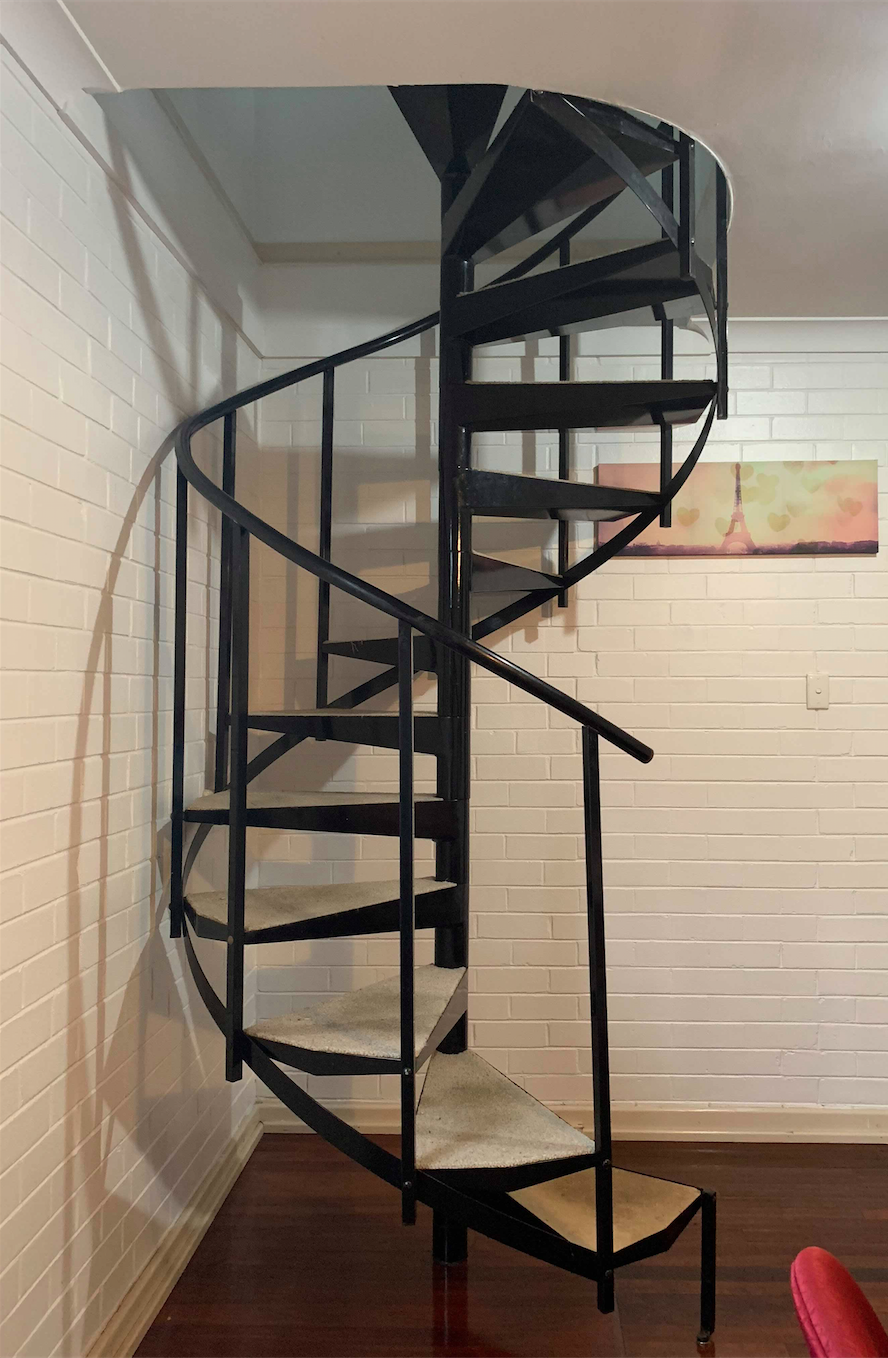
Industrial helical staircase winding around a central newel

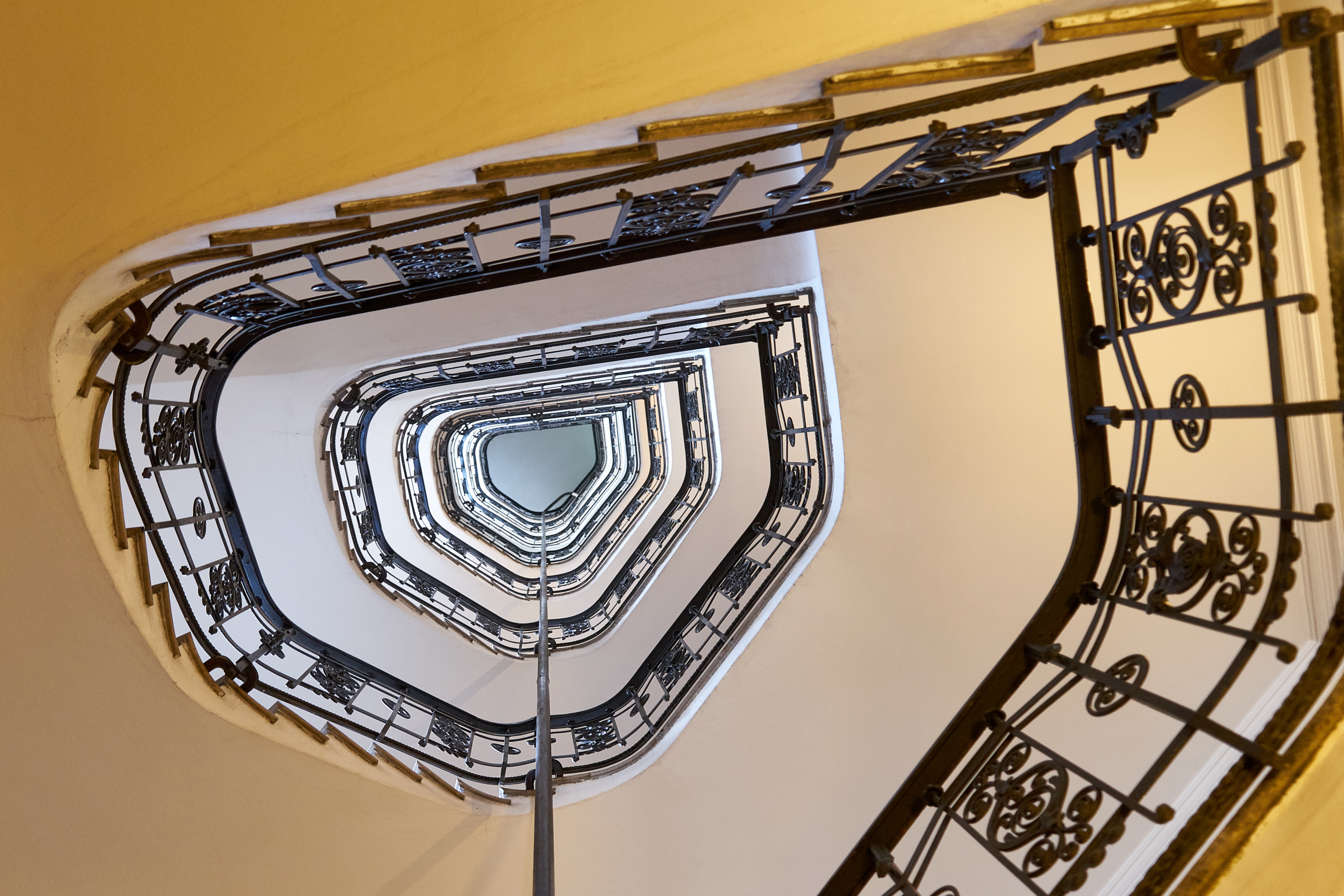
Upwards view of an Art Nouveau helical staircase with a pentagonal core

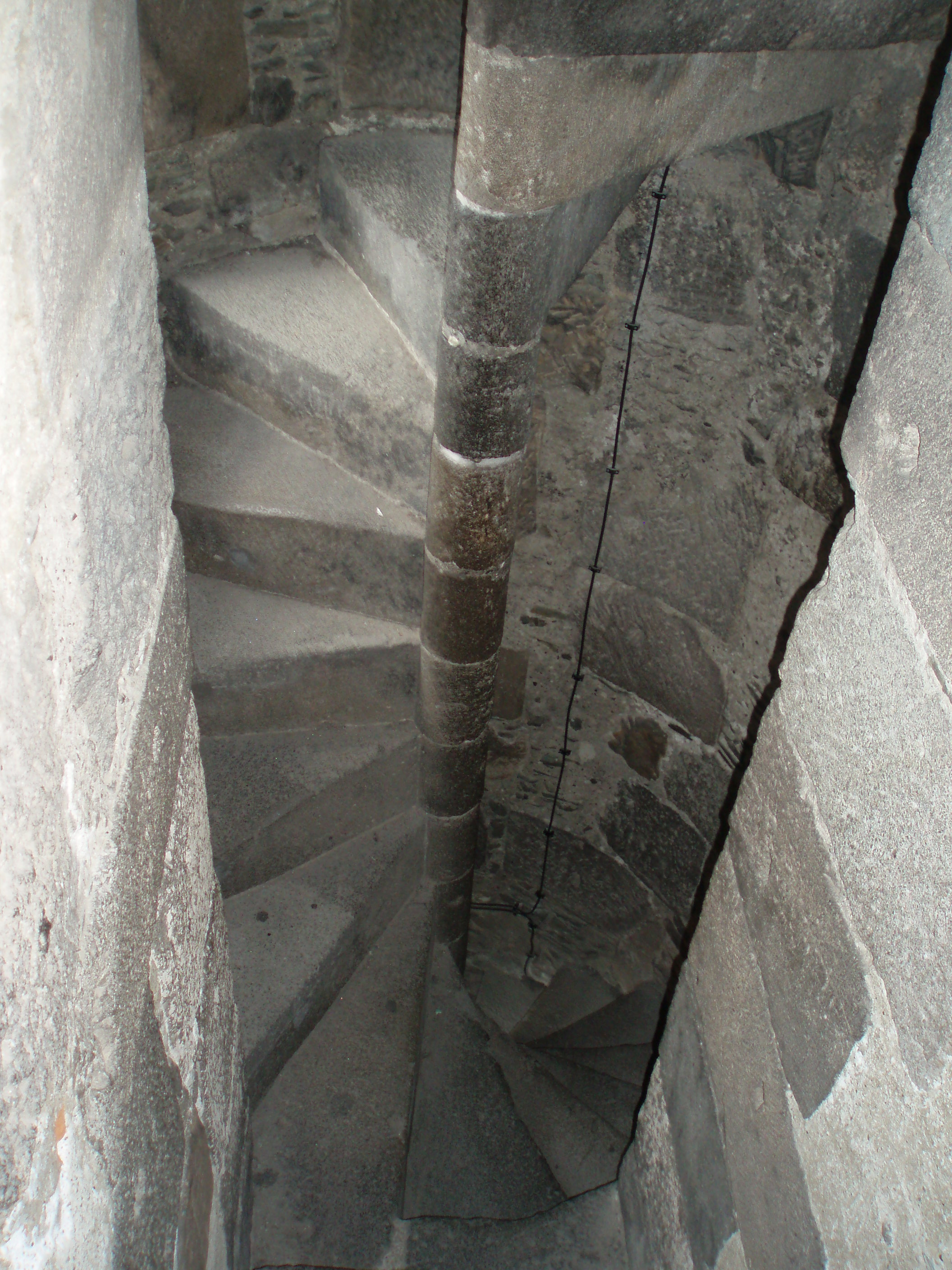
Gothic helical staircase rises clockwise in St. Elisabeth Cathedral in Košice, Slovakia

A fundamental advantage of helical stairs is that they can be very compact, fitting into very narrow spaces and occupying a small footprint. For this reason, they can often be found in ships and submarines, industrial installations, small loft apartments, and other locations where floorspace is scarce. However, this compactness can come at the expense of requiring great craftsmanship and care to produce a safe and effective structure. By contrast, grand helical stairs occupying wide sweeps of space can also be built, to showcase luxurious funding and elegant taste. Architects have used the twisting curvilinear shape as an embellishment, either within or outside of their buildings.

Helical stairs have the disadvantage of being very steep if they are tight (small radius) or are otherwise not supported by a center column. The cylindrical spaces they occupy can have a narrow or wide diameter:

- The wider the helix, the more steps can be accommodated per revolution around the central axis. Therefore, if the helix is large in diameter, due to having a central support column that is strong (and large in diameter) with a special handrail that helps to distribute the load, each step may be longer and therefore the rise between each step may be smaller (equal to that of regular steps). Otherwise, the circumference of the circle at the walk line will be so small that it will be impossible to maintain a normal tread depth and a normal rise height without compromising headroom before reaching the upper floor.
- A small-diameter helix can still have wider treads near the central axis, by making the treads "dance". The narrow end of each tapering wedge-shaped tread is widened, and installed to overlap the adjacent treads above and below.
- To maintain headroom, some helical stairs with a very short diameter must also have a very high rise for each step. These are typically cases where the stairwell must be a small diameter to fit a narrow space, or must not have any center support by design, or may not have any perimeter support. A tight helical stair with a central pole is very space efficient in the use of floor footprint. However, this type of stairway must be used carefully, to avoid an injurious fall.

"Open well" helical or circular stairs designed by architects often do not have a central pole, but there usually is a handrail at both sides of the treads. These designs have the advantage of a more uniform tread depth when compared to a narrow helical staircase. Such stairs may also be built around an elliptical or oval footprint, or even a triangular or pentagonal core. Lacking a central pole, an open well staircase is supported at its outer periphery, or in some cases may be a completely self-supporting and free-standing structure.

An example of perimeter support is the Vatican stairwell or the Gothic stairwell. The latter stairwell is tight because of its location where the diameter must be small. Many helices, however, have sufficient width for normal-size treads (8 inches or 200 millimetres) by being supported by any combination of a center pole, perimeter supports attaching to or beneath the treads, and a helical handrail. In this manner, the treads may be wide enough to accommodate low rises. In self-supporting stairs, the helix needs to be steep to allow the weight to distribute safely down the structure in the most vertical manner possible. Helical steps with center columns or perimeter support do not have this limitation. Building codes may limit the use of helical stairs to small areas or secondary usage, if their treads are not sufficiently wide or have risers taller than 9.5 inches (240 mm).

Double helix staircases are possible, with two independent helical stairs in the same vertical space, allowing one person to ascend and another to descend without ever meeting, if they choose different helices. For examples, the Pozzo di San Patrizio allows one-way traffic so that laden and unladen mules can ascend and descend without obstruction, while Château de Chambord, Château de Blois, and the Crédit Lyonnais headquarters ensure separation for social purposes.

Emergency exit stairways, though built with landings and straight runs of stairs, are often functionally double helices, with two separate stairs intertwined and occupying the same floor footprint. This is often in compliance with legal safety requirements to have two independent fire escape paths.

The Grand Shaft, part of the Western Heights defences at Dover, is a rare example of a triple helix staircase. Built between 1803 and 1807, its primary wartime function was to deploy defending troops quickly from clifftop barracks to the harbor shore, a height difference of 140 feet (43 m). Using a triple helix increased the throughput of the shaft to three times that of a single staircase. By Victorian times in everyday peacetime use, its three stairs were class-segregated between "Officers and their ladies, Sergeants and their wives"" and "Soldiers and their women", with two-way traffic on all three stairs.

Helical stairs can be characterized by the number of turns that are made. A "quarter-turn" stair deposits the person facing 90° from the starting orientation. Likewise, there are half-turn, three-quarters-turn and full-turn stairs. A continuous helix may make many turns depending on the height. Very tall multi-turn helical staircases are usually found in old stone towers within fortifications, churches, and in lighthouses. Winders may be used in combination with straight stairs to turn the direction of the stairs. This allows for a large number of permutations in designs.

=== Historic uses ===
The earliest known helical staircases appear in Temple A in the Greek colony Selinunte, Sicily, to both sides of the cella. The temple was constructed around 480–470 BCE.

When used in Roman architecture, helical stairs were generally restricted to elite luxury structures. They were then adopted into Christian ecclesiastic architecture. During the Renaissance and Baroque periods, increasingly spectacular helical stairways were devised, first deleting walled enclosures, and then deleting a central post to leave an open well. Modern designs have trended towards minimalism, culminating in helical stairs made largely of transparent glass, or consisting only of stair treads with minimal visible support.

There is a common misconception that helical staircases in castles rose in a clockwise direction, to hinder right-handed attackers. While clockwise helical staircases are more common in castles than anti-clockwise, they were even more common in medieval structures without a military role, such as religious buildings. Studies of helical stairs in castles have concluded that "the role and position of spirals in castles ... had a much stronger domestic and status role than a military function" and that "there are sufficient examples of anticlockwise stairs in Britain and France in [the 11th and 12th centuries] to indicate that the choice must have depended both on physical convenience and architectural practicalities and there was no military ideology that demanded clockwise staircases in the cause of fighting efficiency or advantage".

Developments in manufacturing and design have also led to the introduction of kit form helical stairs. Modular, standardized steps and handrails can be bolted together to form a complete unit. These stairs can be made out of steel, timber, concrete, or a combination of materials.

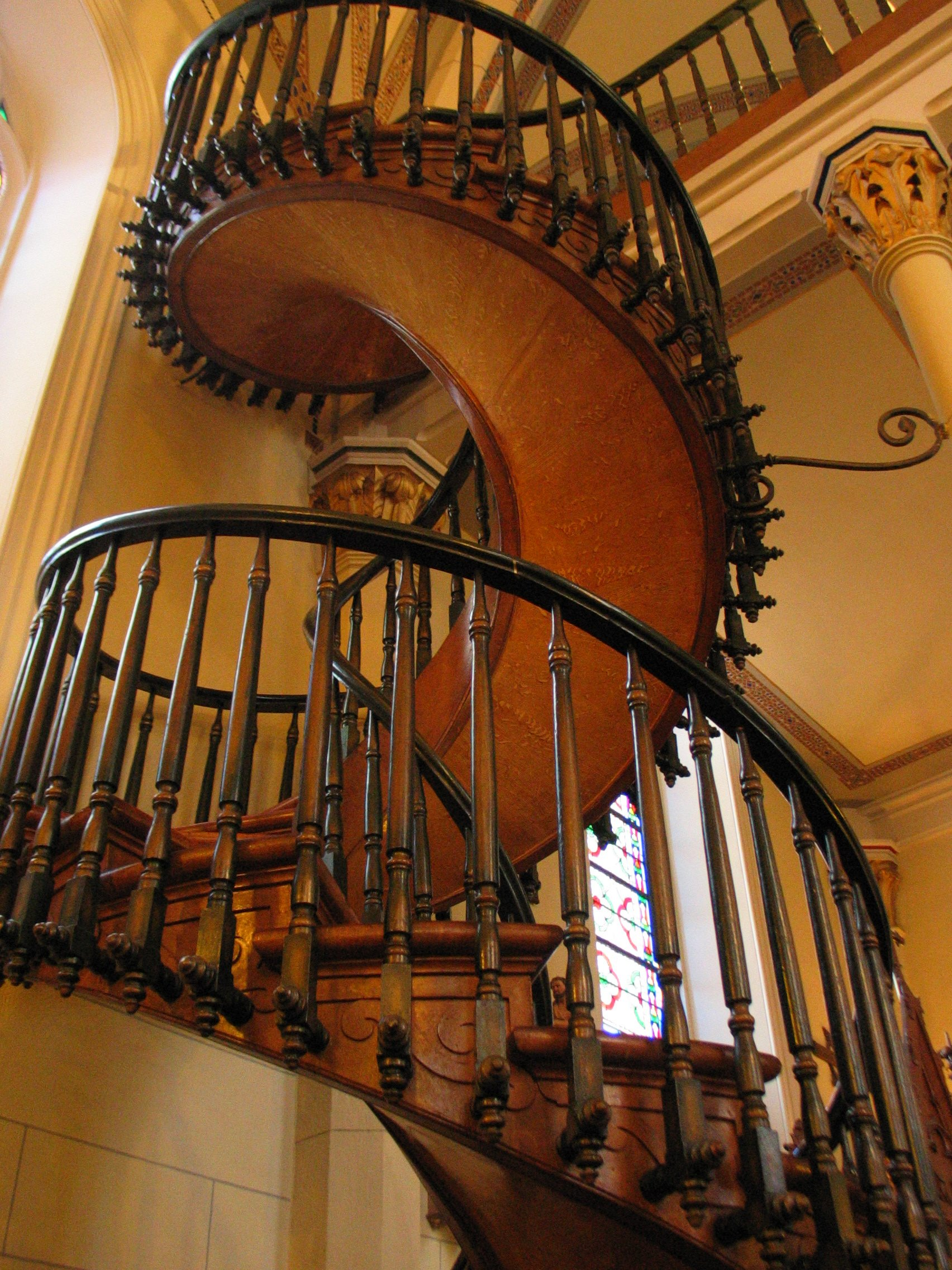
There is no newel at Loretto Chapel's helical staircase (the "Miracle stair") in Santa Fe, New Mexico, United States.

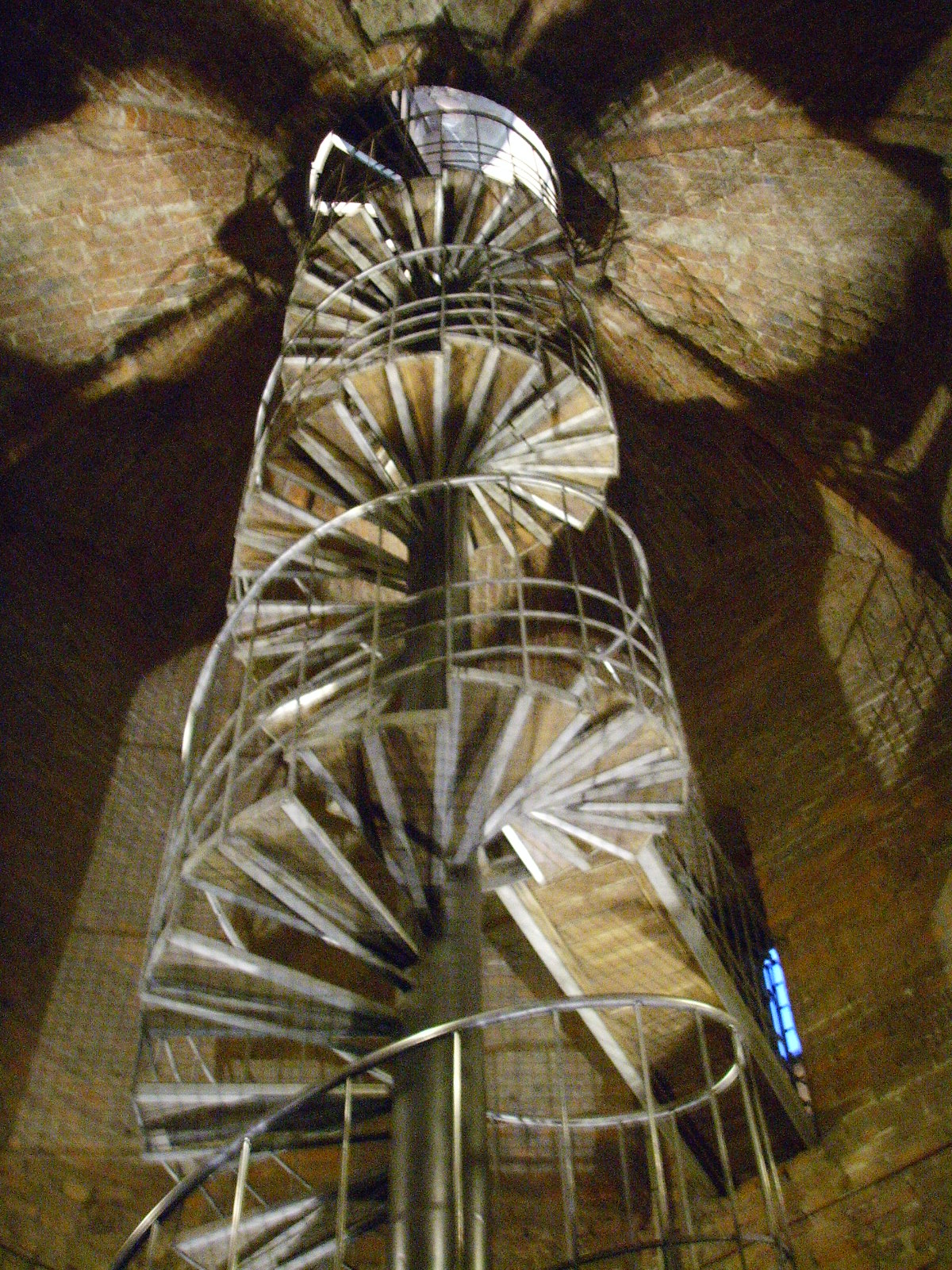
A helical staircase inside Cremona's Torrazzo, Italy

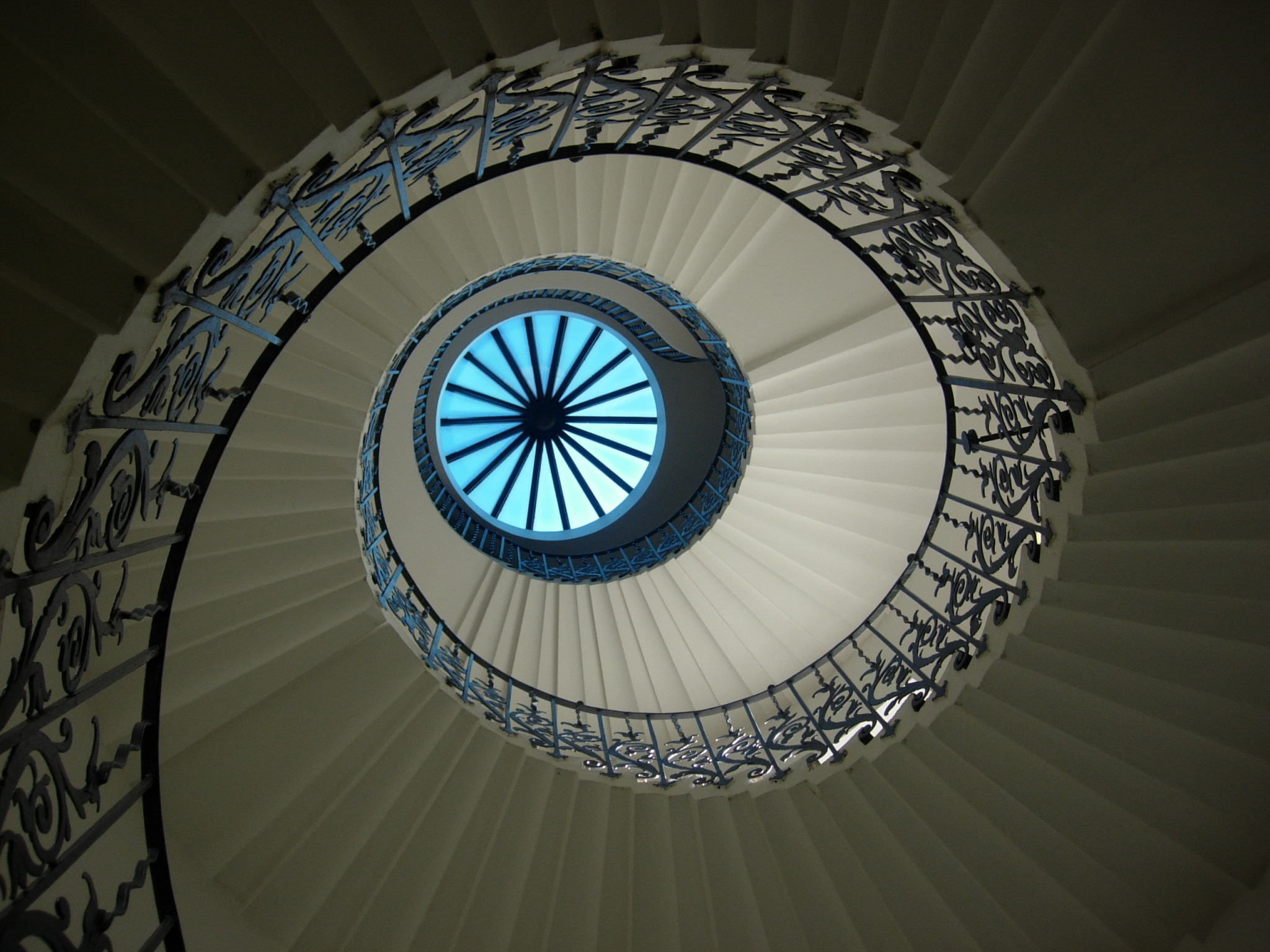
Upward view of the Tulip Stairs & lantern at the Queen's House, Greenwich, England

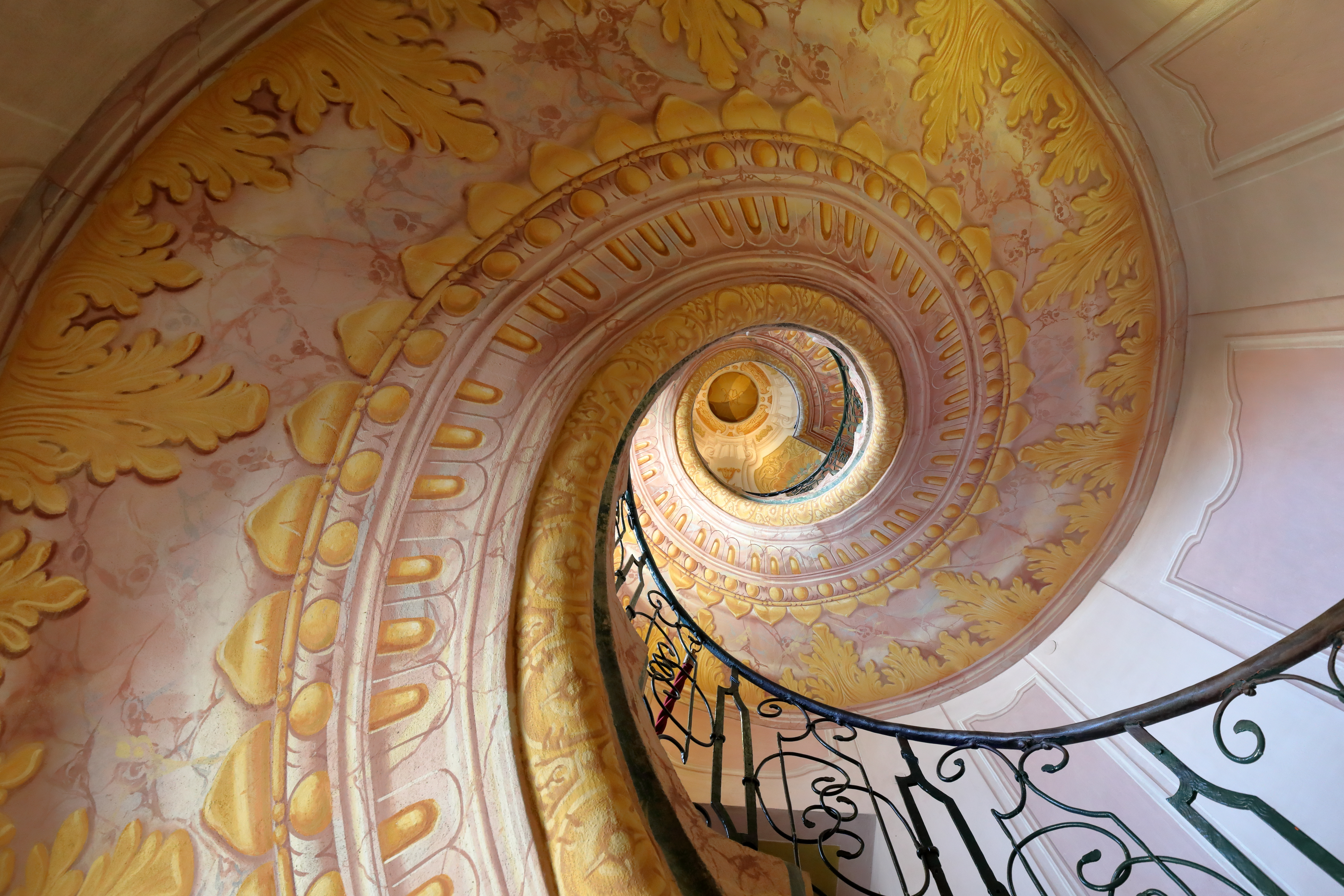
Helical stairway seen from below; Melk Abbey, Austria

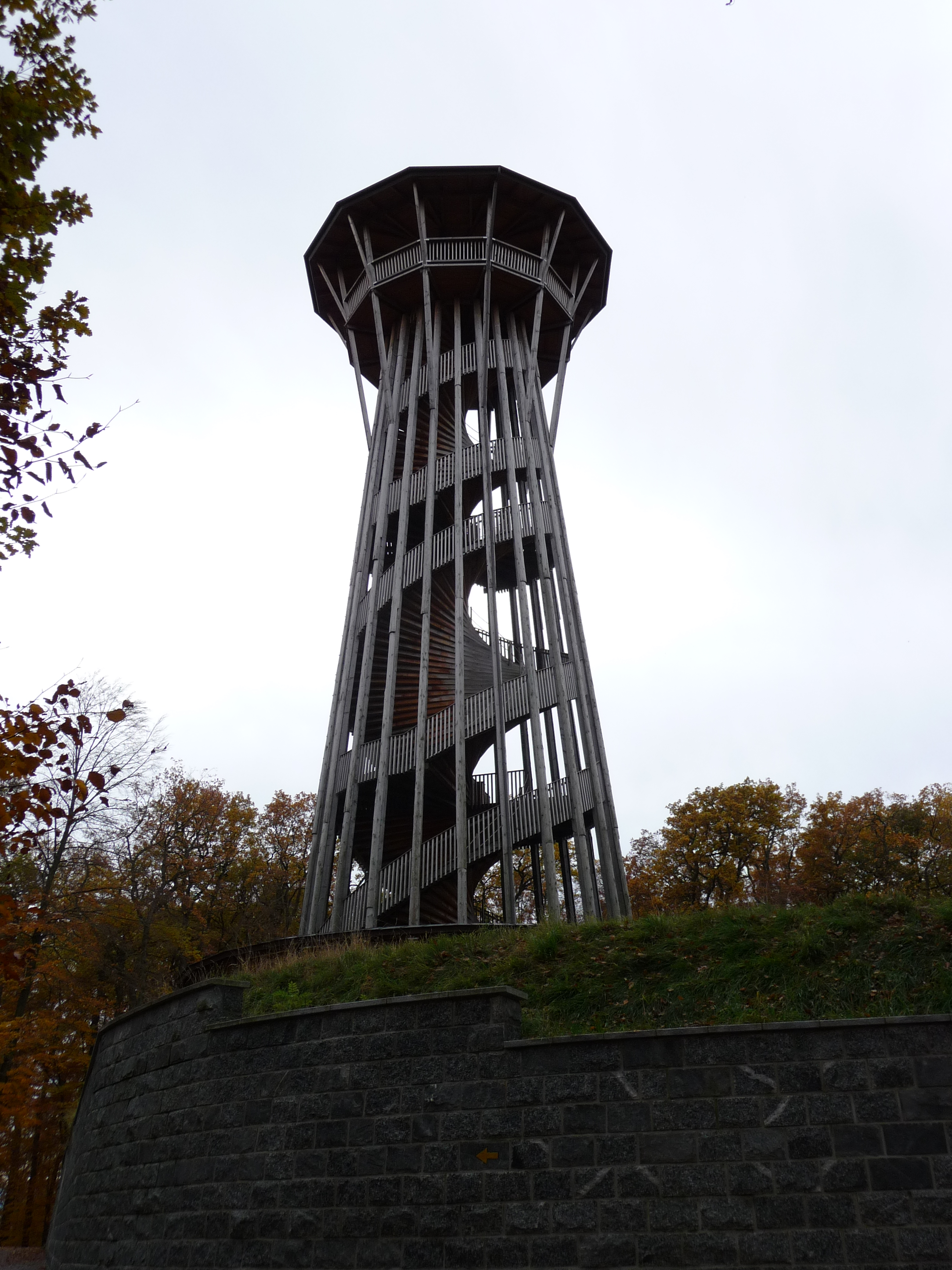
The wooden helical stairs of the Tour de Sauvabelin in Lausanne

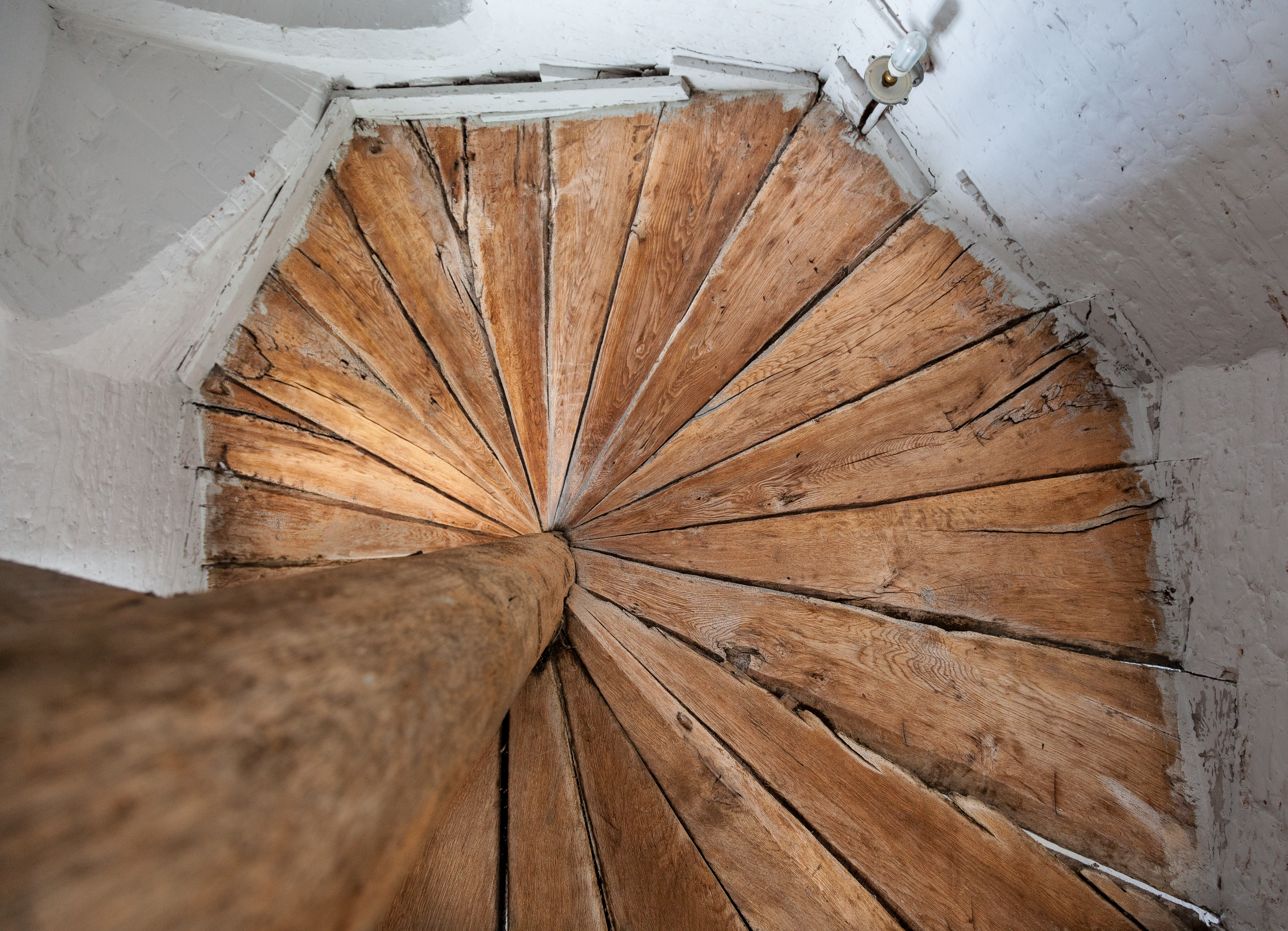
Tudor staircase, Madingley Hall, Cambridgeshire, England, from below

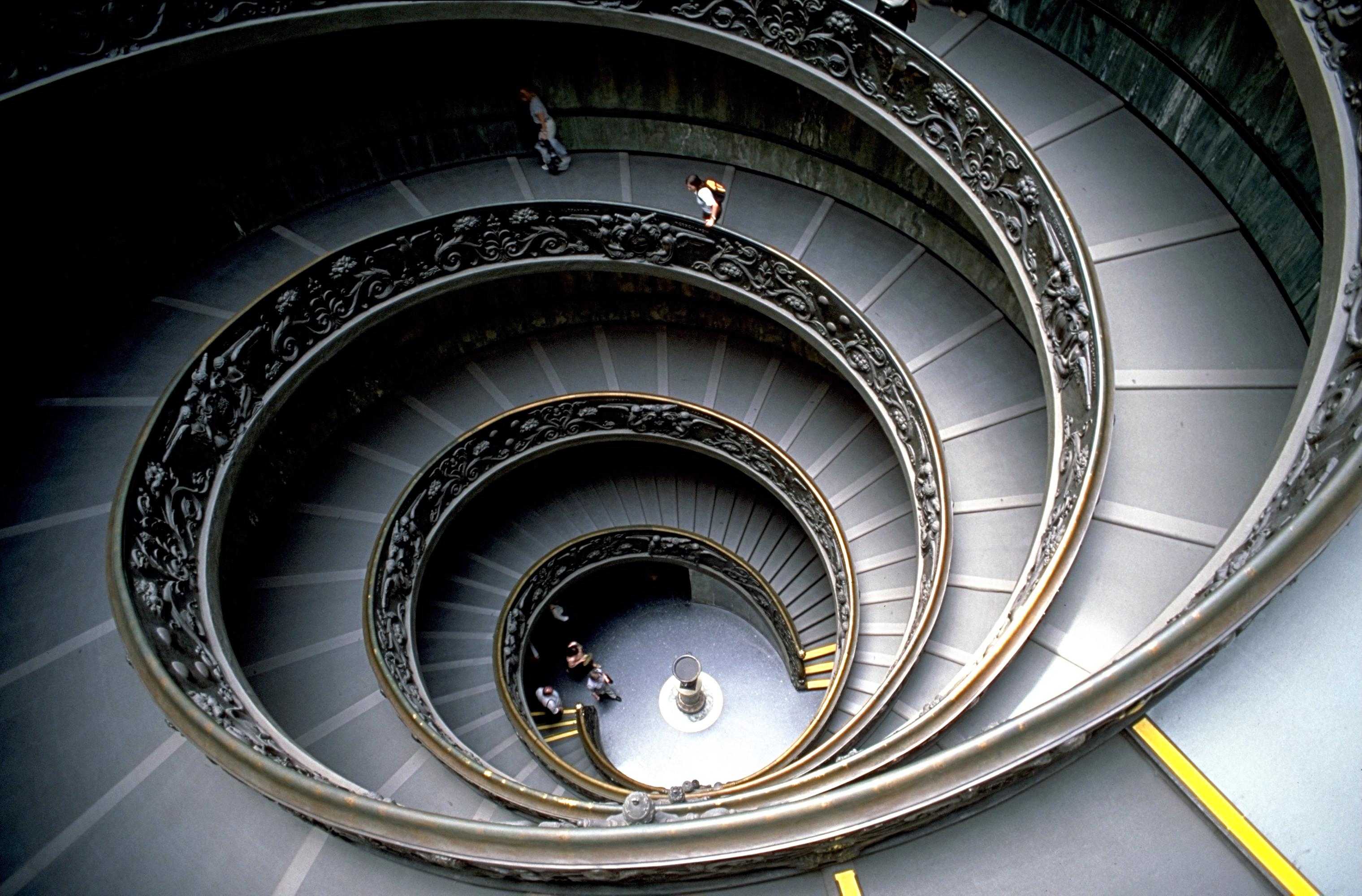
The Bramante Staircase, Vatican Museums, showing the two access points at the bottom of the stairs

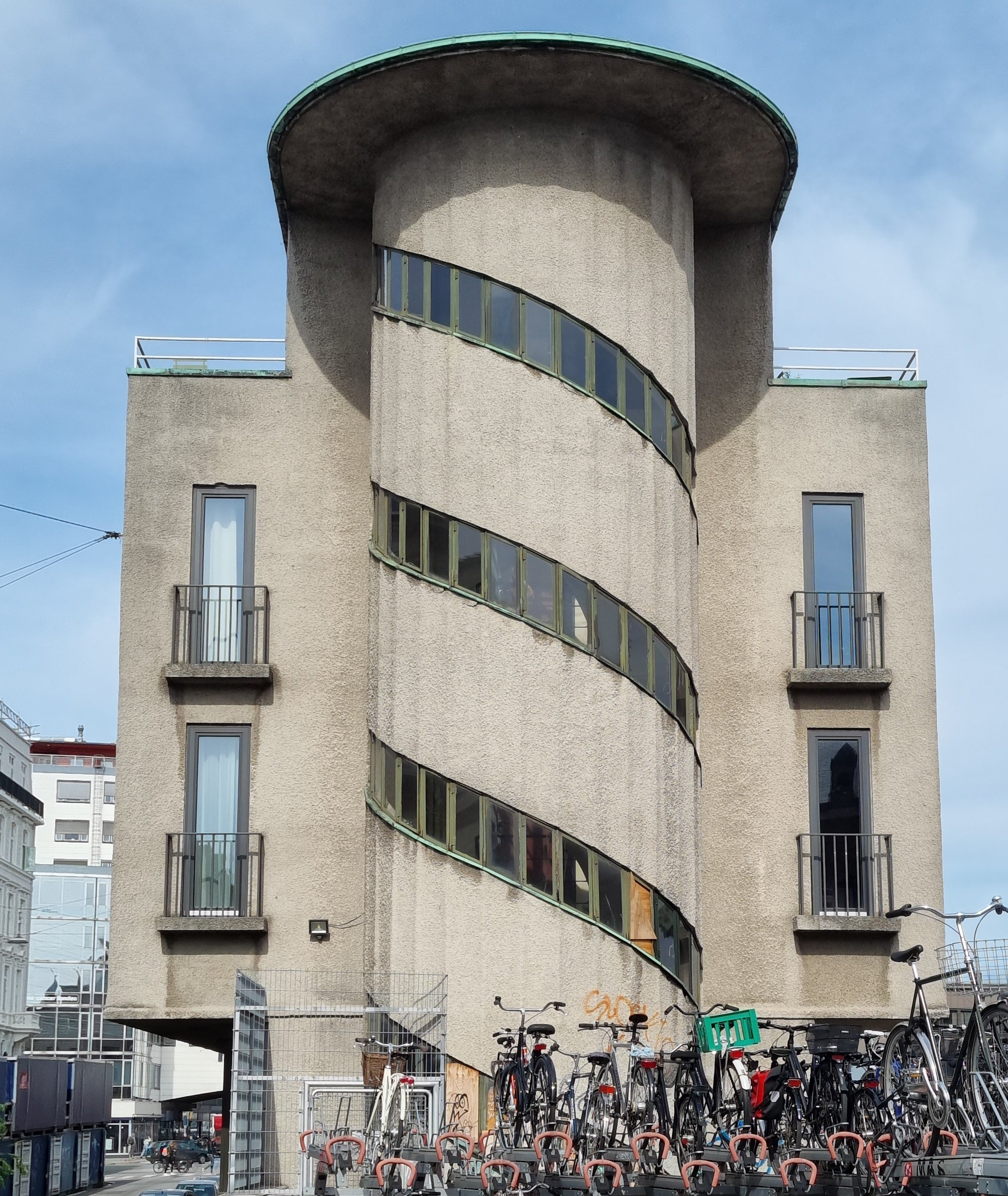
Helical stairs at Hotel Astoria, Copenhagen

== Alternating tread stairs ==
Comparison of shallow stairs (1), steep stairs (2), and alternating-tread stairs (3)

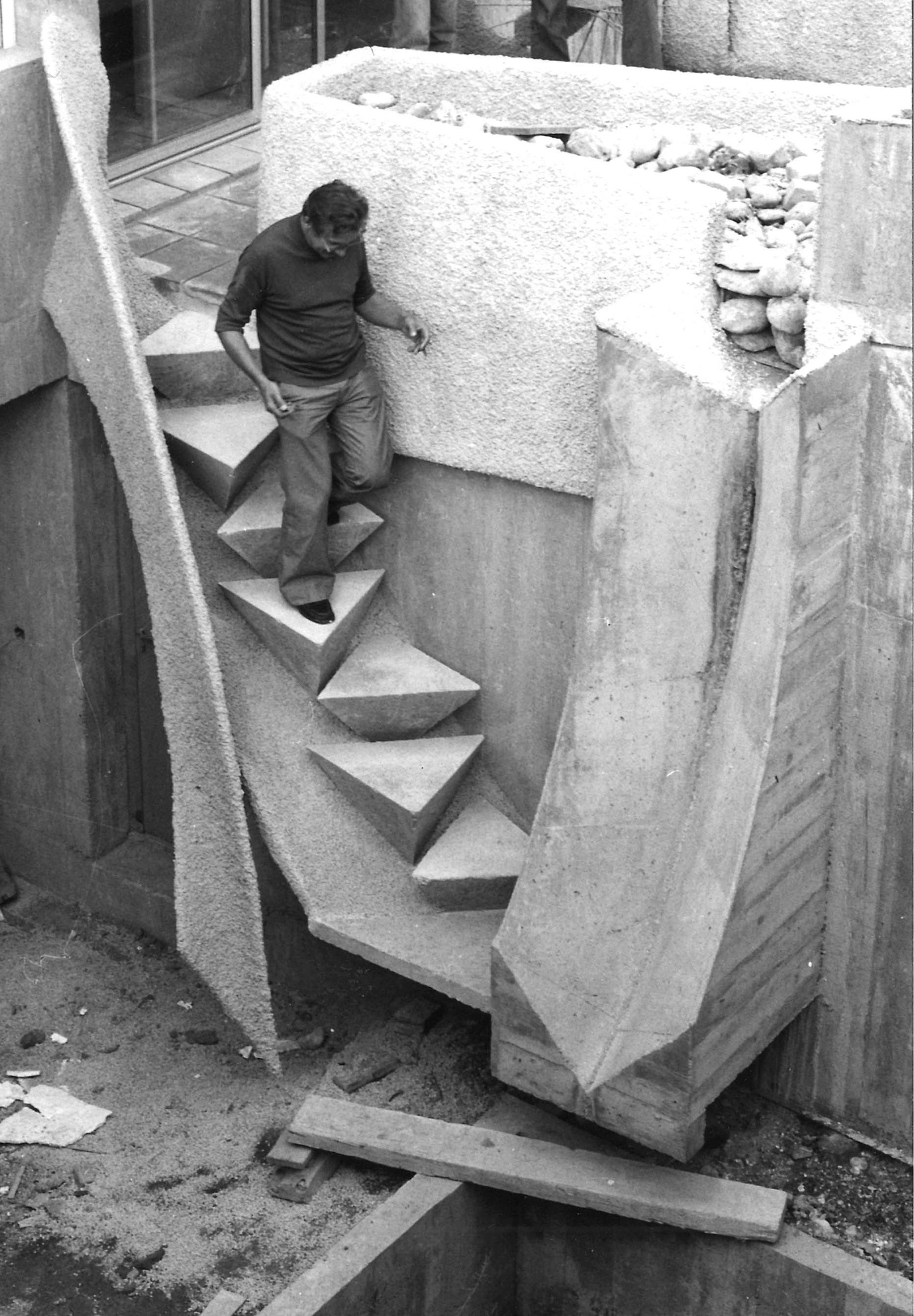
Pradier house, Lavaur, France (1978)

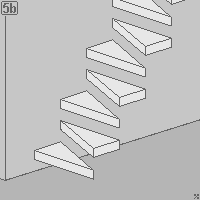
Diagram of tapered triangle variant alternating tread stairs

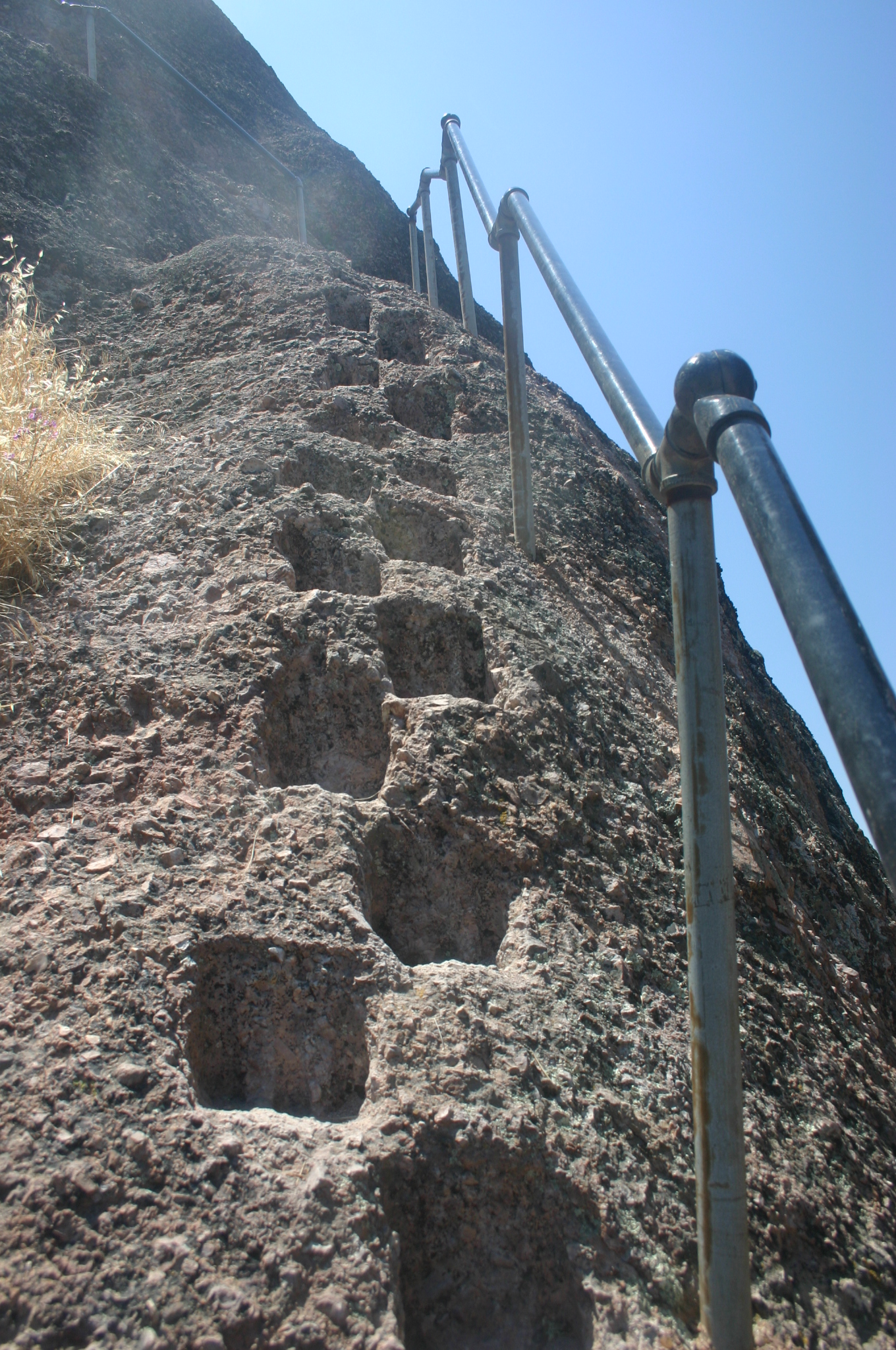
Alternating tread stair climbing a steep prominence in Pinnacles National Park

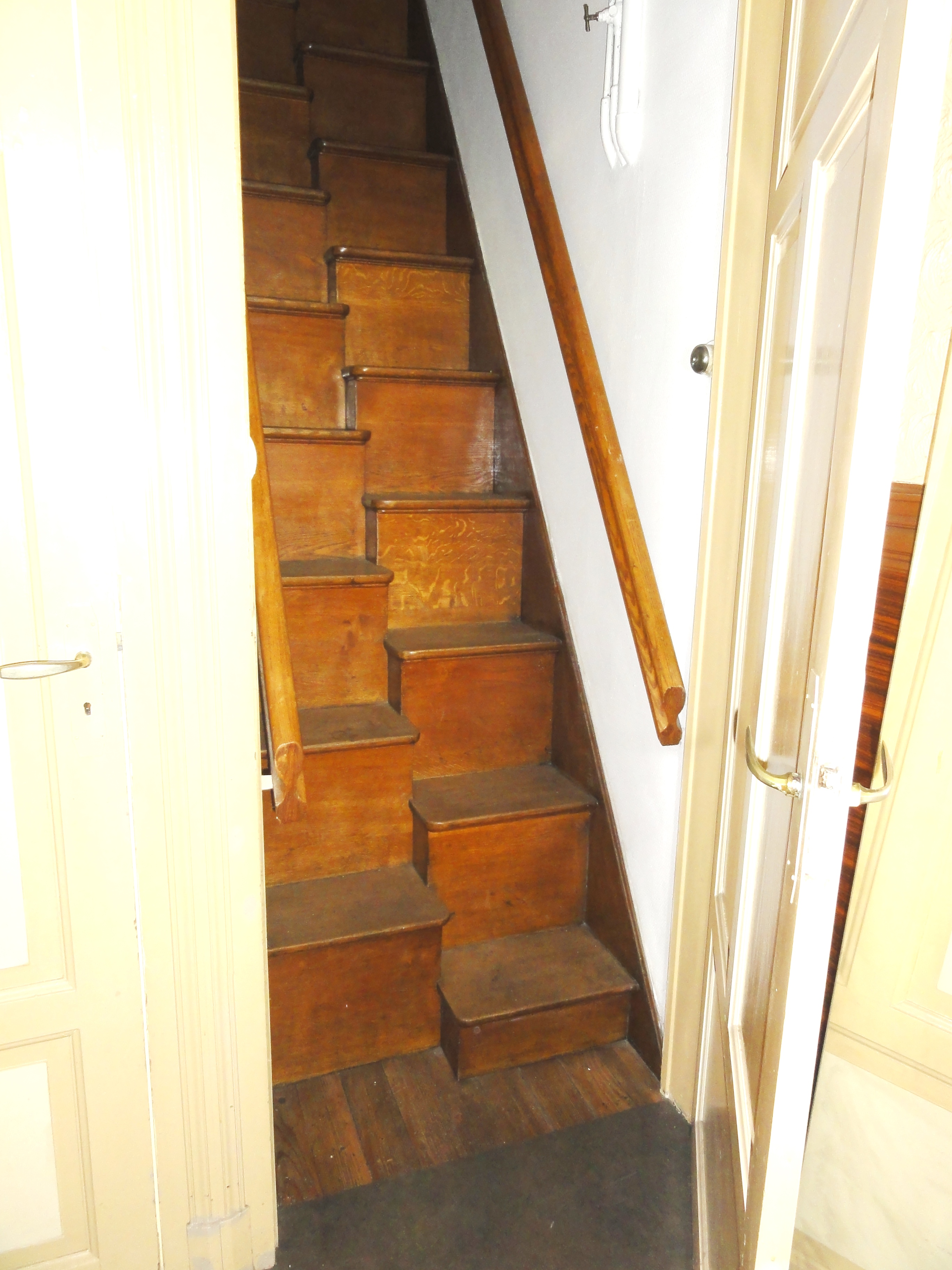
Steep rise alternating tread stairs

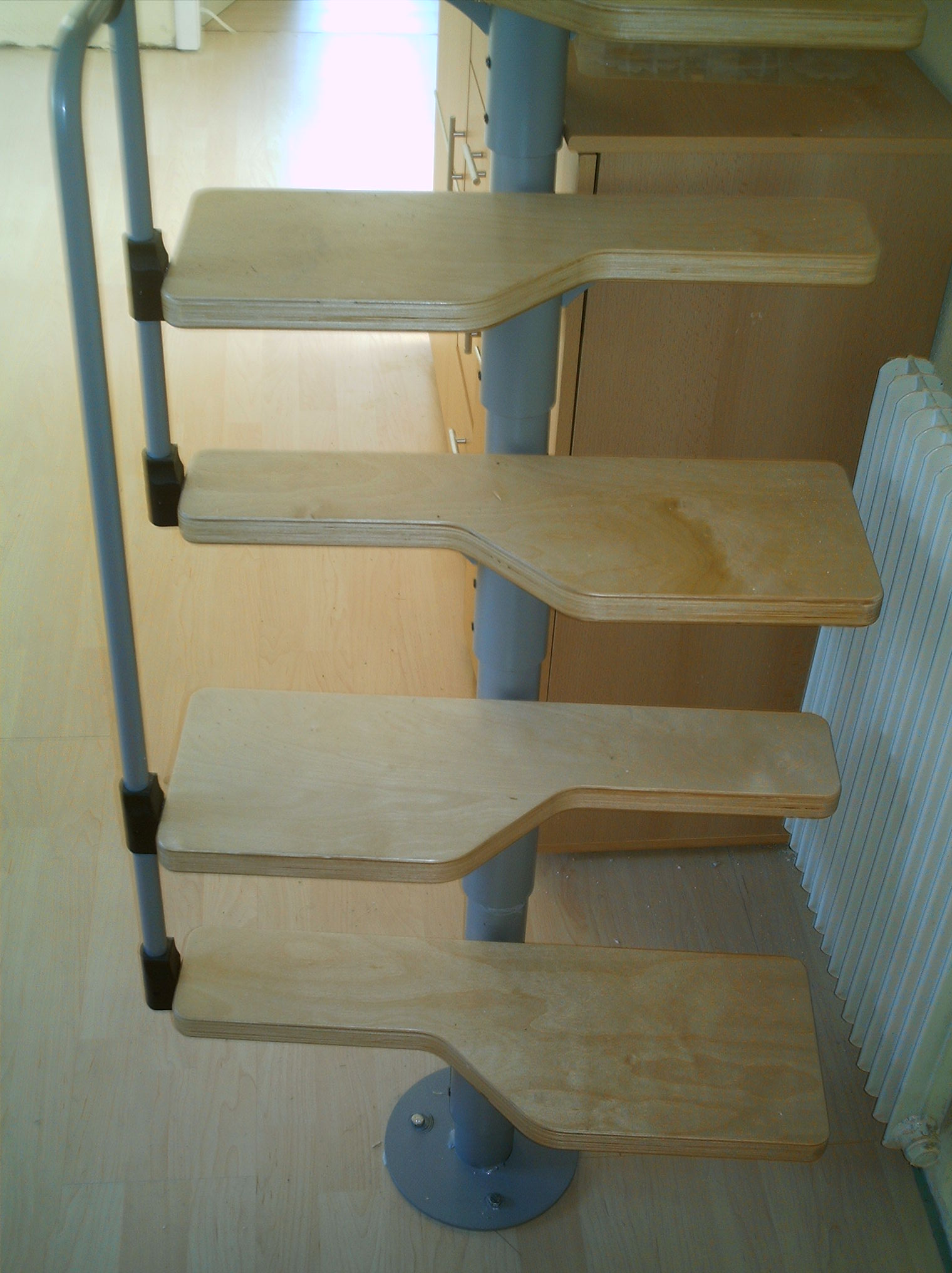
Minimalist alternating tread stairs (Germany)

Where there is insufficient space for the full run length of normal stairs, "alternating tread stairs" may be used (other names are "paddle stairs", "zig-zag stairs", or "double-riser stairs"). Alternating tread stairs can be designed to allow for a safe forward-facing descent of very steep stairs (however, designs with recessed treads or footholds do not have this feature). The treads are designed such that they alternate between treads for each foot: one step is wide on the left side; the next step is wide on the right side. There is insufficient space on the narrow portion of the step for the other foot to stand, hence the person must always use the correct foot on the correct step. The slope of alternating tread stairs can be as high as 65° as opposed to standard stairs, which are almost always less than 45°.

An advantage of some alternating tread stairs is that people can descend while facing forward, in the direction of travel. The only other alternative in such short spaces would be a ladder, which requires a backward-facing descent. Alternating tread stairs may not be safe for small children, the elderly, or the physically challenged. Building codes typically classify them as ladders, and will only allow them where ladders are allowed, usually basement or attic utility or storage areas infrequently accessed.

The block model in the image illustrates the space efficiency gained by an alternating tread stair. The alternating stairs (3) requires one unit of space per step: the same as the half-width stairs (2), and half as much as the full-width stairs (1). Thus, the horizontal distance between steps is in this case reduced by a factor of two, reducing the size of each step. The horizontal distance between steps is reduced by a factor less than two if for construction reasons there are narrow "unused" step extensions. These stairs often (including this example) illustrate the mathematical principle of glide plane symmetry: the mirror image with respect to the vertical center plane corresponds to a shift by one step.

Alternating tread stairs are sometimes referred to as "witches stairs", in the supposed belief that they were created during an earlier era as an attempt to repel witches who were thought to be unable to climb such stairs. Such a fanciful origin of the term has since been disproved, with experts finding no mention in any historical literature of stairs that were believed to prevent access by witches. Alternating tread stairs have been in use since at least 1888. Today, the design is used in some loft apartments to access bedrooms or storage spaces.

== Emergency exit stairs ==
Maximum height of building allowed with a single staircase by country

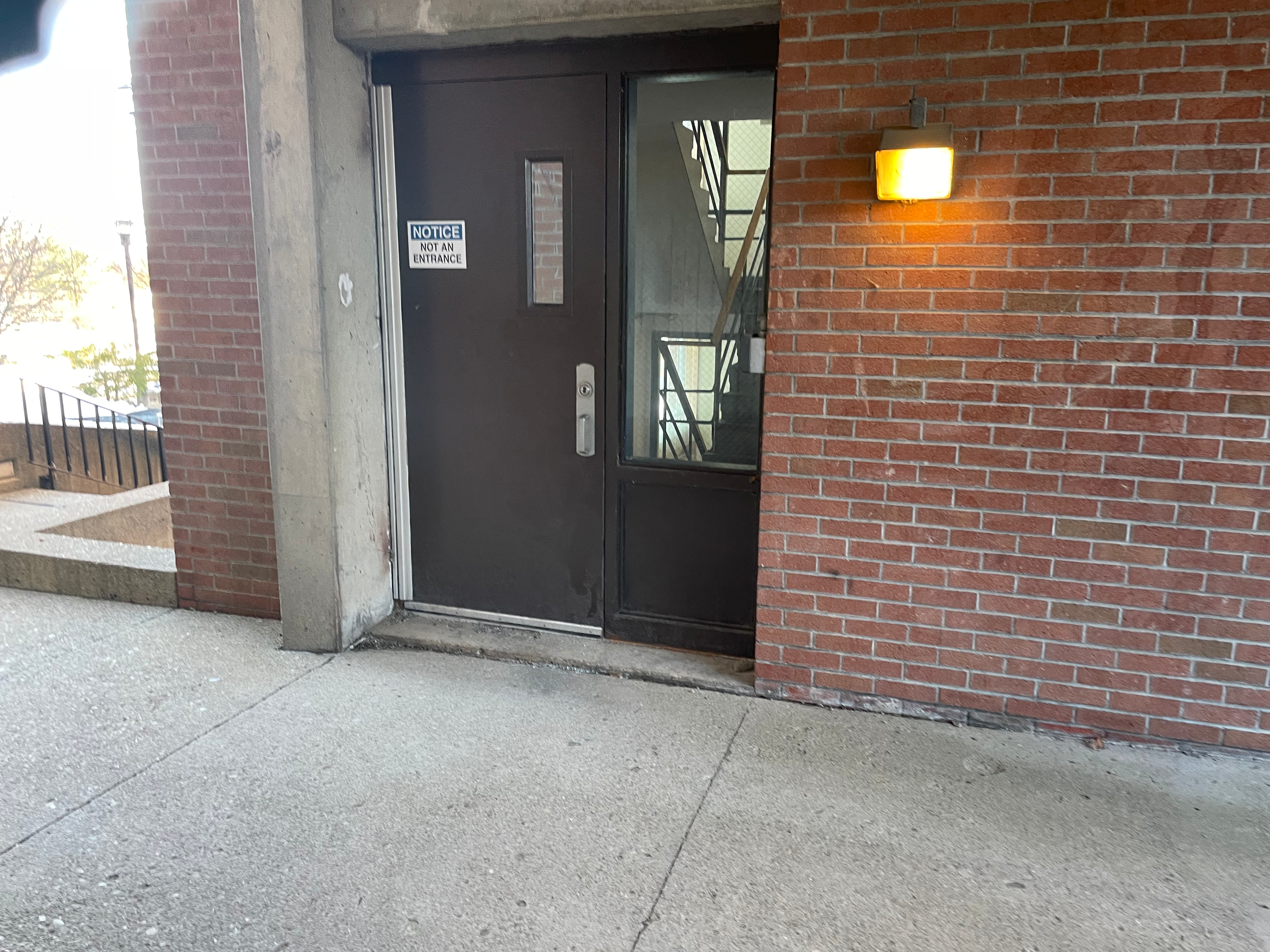
Emergency exit stairs are usually sparsely furnished because of fire code restrictions

Local building codes often dictate the number of emergency exits required for a building of a given size, including specifying a minimum number of stairwells. For any building bigger than a private house, modern codes invariably specify at least two sets of stairs, completely isolated from each other so that if one becomes impassable due to smoke or flames, the other remains usable.

The traditional way to satisfy this requirement was to construct two separate stairwell stacks, each occupying its own footprint within each floorplate. Each stairwell is internally configured into an arrangement often called a "U-return" or "return" design. The two stairwells may be constructed next to each other, separated by a fireproof partition, or optionally the two stairwells may be located at some distance from each other within the floorplan. These traditional arrangements have the advantage of being easily understood by building occupants and occasional visitors.

Some architects save floor footprint space while still meeting the exit requirement, by housing two stairwells in a "double helix" or "scissors stairs" configuration whereby two stairwells occupy the same floor footprint, but are intertwined while being separated by fireproof partitions along their entire run. However, this design deposits anybody descending the stack into alternating locations on each successive floor, and this can be very disorienting. Some building codes recommend using a color-coded stripe and signage to distinguish otherwise identical-looking stairwells from each other, and to make following a quick exit path easier.

== Ergonomics ==
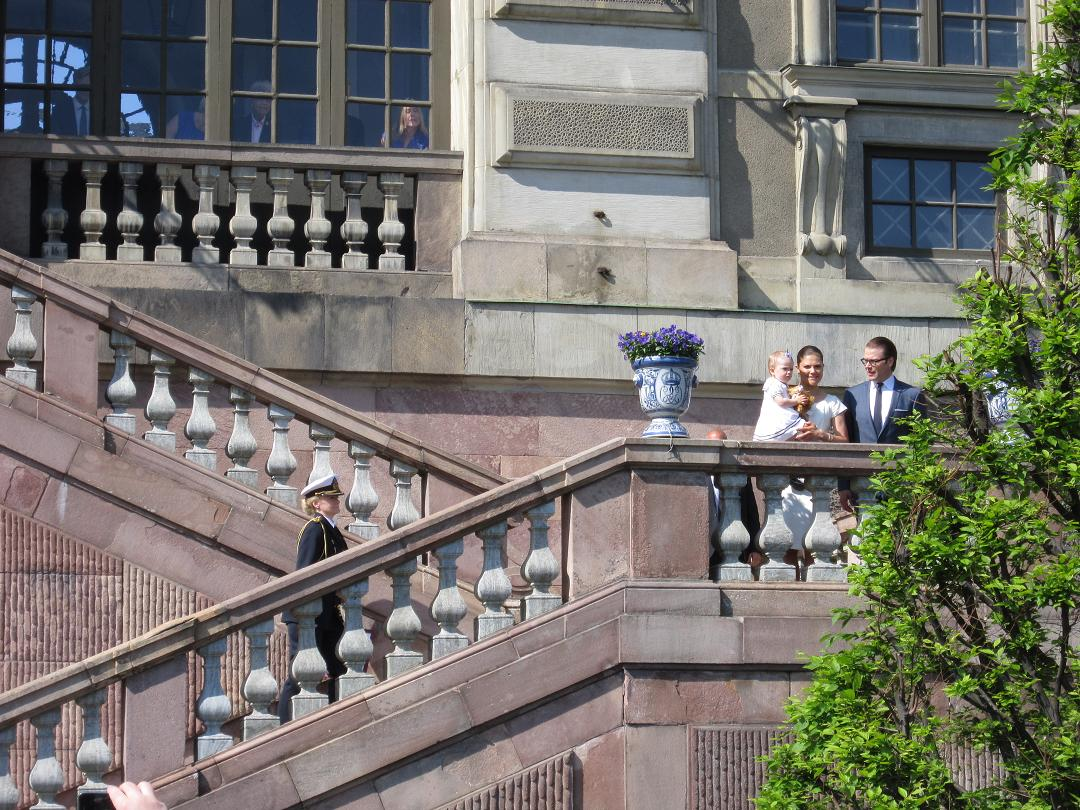
On a rarely used staircase from before 1754, the Crown Princess of Sweden ascends from the Stockholm Palace garden with her husband and baby in 2013.

Ergonomically and for safety reasons, stairs must have certain dimensions so that people can comfortably use them. Building codes typically specify certain clearances so that the stairs are not too steep or narrow.

Nicolas-François Blondel in the last volume of his Cours d'architecture (1675–1683) was the first known person to establish the ergonomic relationship of tread and riser dimensions. He specified that 2 × riser + tread = step length.

It is estimated that a noticeable misstep occurs once in 7,398 uses and a minor accident on a flight of stairs occurs once in 63,000 uses. Stairs can be a hazardous obstacle for some, so some people choose to live in residences without stairs so that they are protected from injury.

Stairs are not suitable for wheelchairs and other vehicles. A stairlift is a mechanical device for lifting wheelchairs up and down stairs. For sufficiently wide stairs, a rail is mounted to the treads of the stairs, or attached to the wall. A chair is attached to the rail and the person on the chair is lifted as the chair moves along the rail.

== Stairs in art and architecture ==
Religious shrines and memorial structures are often approached via stairs, sometimes numbering hundreds or thousands of steps. Many Neoclassical buildings feature prominent wide stairs ascending to an elevated platform or plinth where the main entrance is located. In recent years, increasing concerns about accessibility have encouraged architects to retrofit discreet lower-level public entrances or elevators to ease wheelchair access.

Large open-well helical stairs have been used as a central feature in public buildings from the Renaissance until modern times. A 21st-century version is the helical glass-enclosed, glass-treaded stairways at the center of several flagship Apple Stores.

Vessel is an artistic structure and visitor attraction which was built as part of the Hudson Yards Redevelopment Project in Manhattan, New York City. Built to plans by the British designer Thomas Heatherwick, the elaborate honeycomb-like structure rises 16 stories and consists of 154 flights of stairs, 2,500 steps, and 80 landings for visitors to explore.

Stairs may also be a fanciful physical construct such as the "stairs that go nowhere" located at the Winchester Mystery House. The Penrose stairs, devised by Lionel and Roger Penrose, are a famous impossible object. The image distorts perspective in such a manner that the stairs appear to be never-ending, a physical impossibility. The image was adopted by M. C. Escher in his iconic lithograph Ascending and Descending.

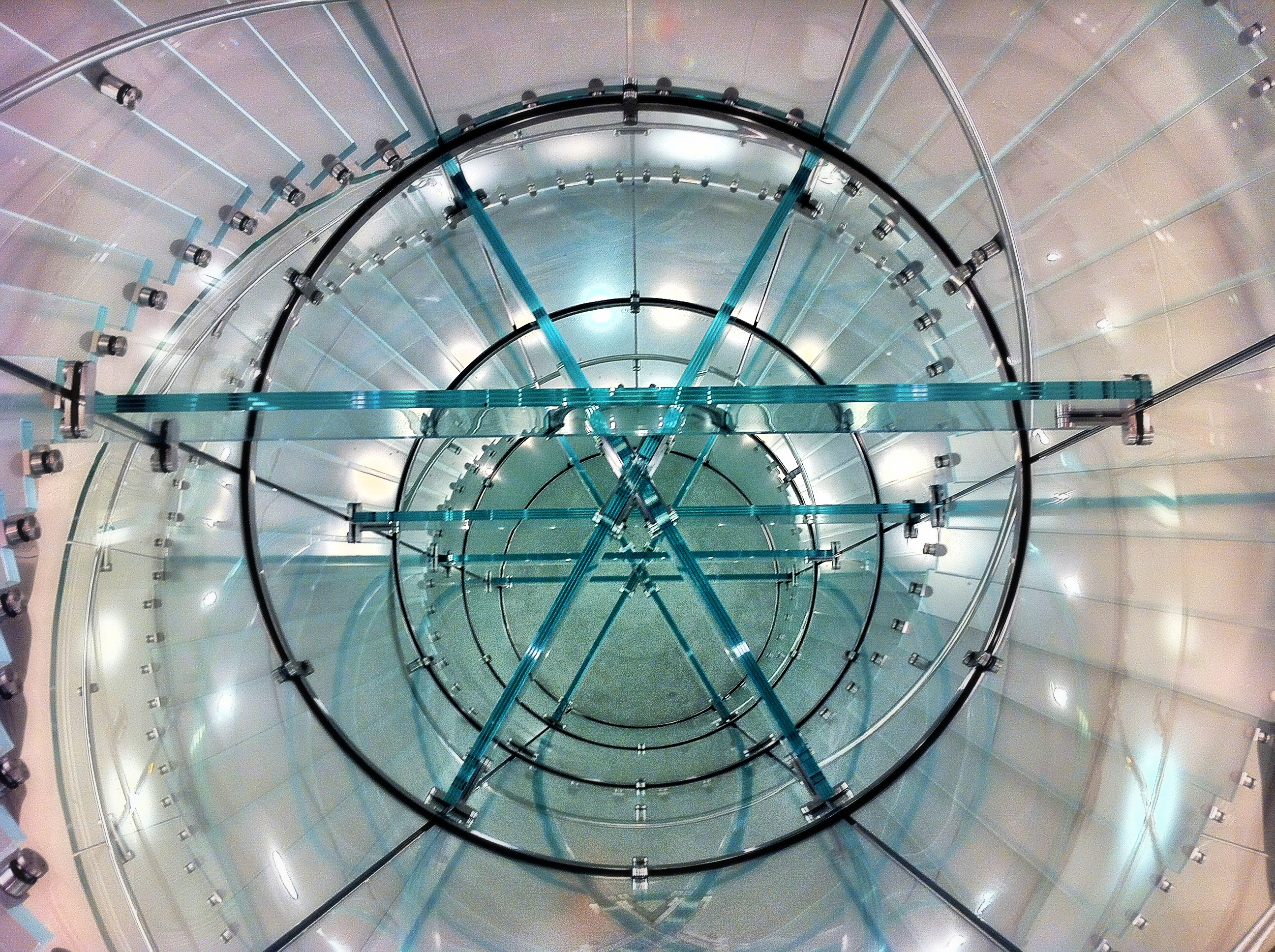
Overhead view of glass-treaded helical stairs at Apple Store in Boston

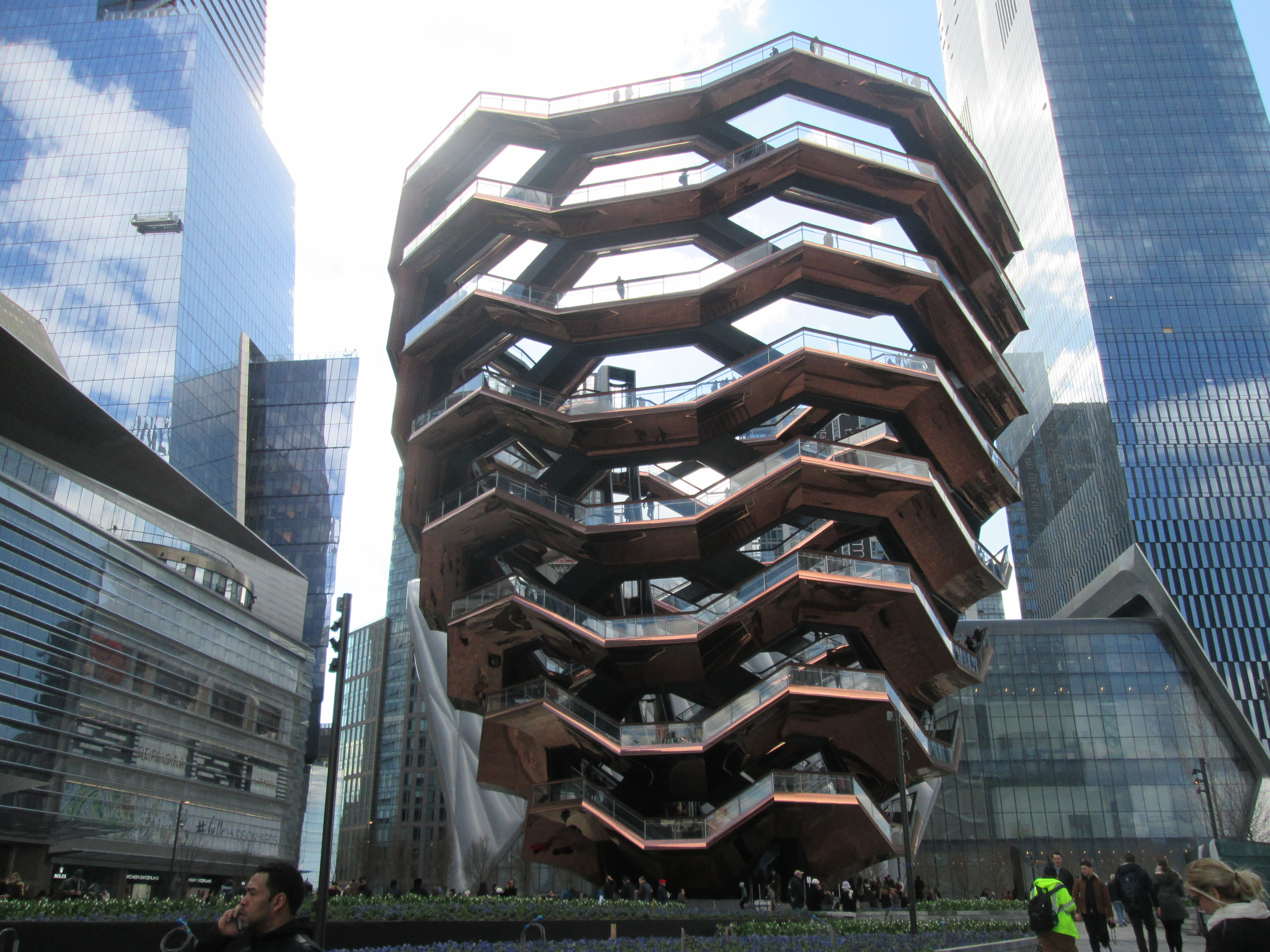
Vessel, by Thomas Heatherwick, is composed of multiple stairways and landings

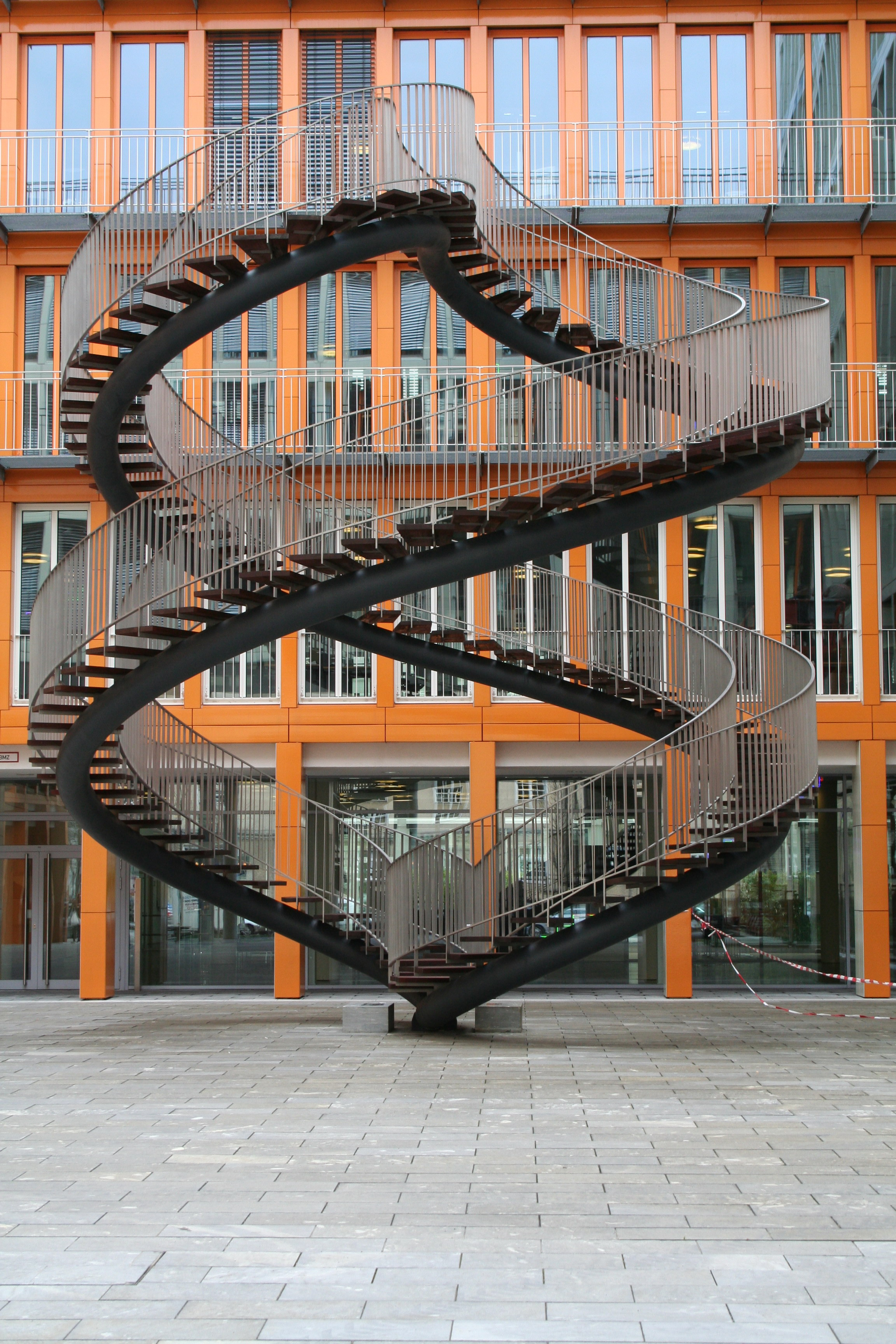
Umschreibung ("Circumscription"), by Olafur Eliasson, an endless stairway at KPMG, Munich, Germany

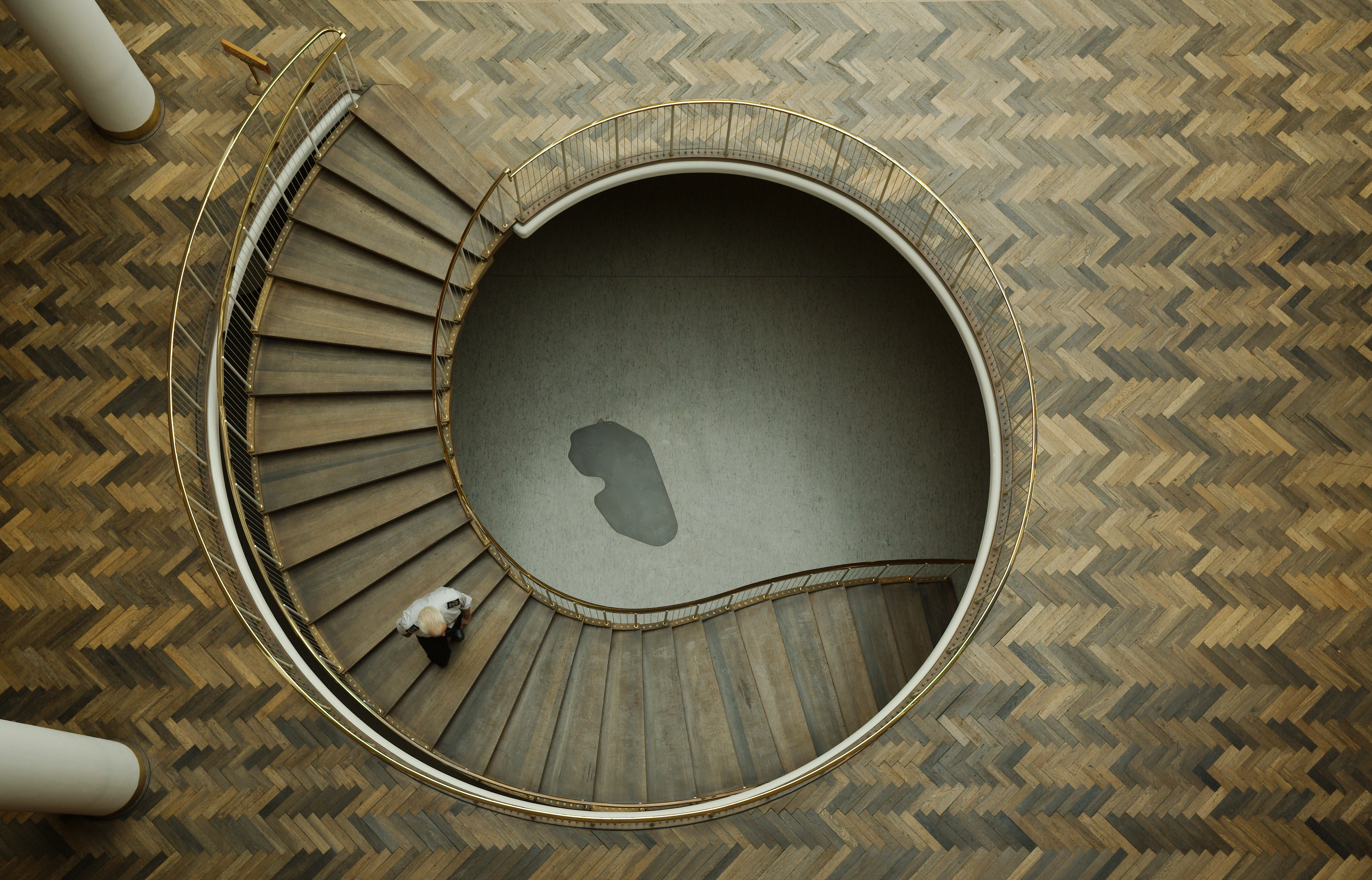
A staircase in Aarhus City Hall, Denmark. The dark grey, kidney-shaped capstone seen at the bottom of the stairwell contains the three foundation stones of the building and was used as the reference point for height adjustment during the entire building period.

== Notable sets of stairs ==
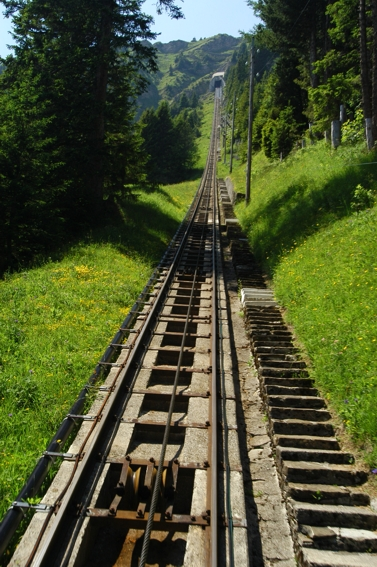
The world's longest stairway, at the Niesenbahn funicular, in Switzerland, has 11,674 steps

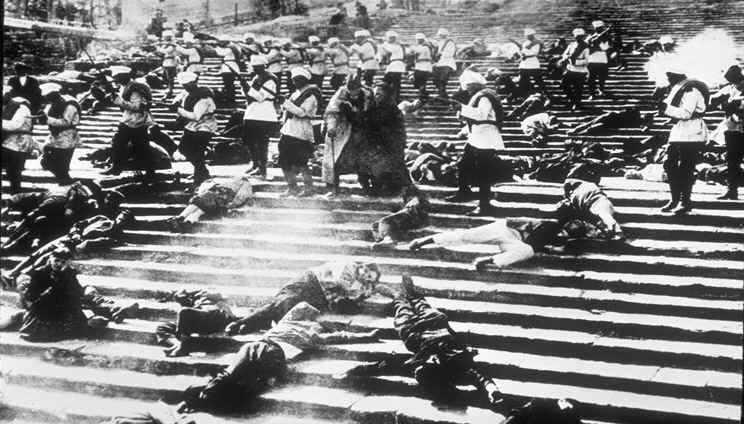
A wide shot of the massacre on the "Potemkin Stairs" from the 1925 silent film Battleship Potemkin

- The longest stairway is listed by Guinness Book of Records as the service stairway for the Niesenbahn funicular railway near Spiez, Switzerland, with 11,674 steps and a height of 1,669 m (5,476 ft). The stairs are usually employee-only, but there is a public run called Niesenlauf once a year.
- Mount Girnar, one of the holiest of sacred places for Hindu, Jain, and Buddhist followers, and also for some Muslims, is located in Junagadh district in the Indian state of Gujarat in Saurashtrian peninsula. At a height of 1100 metres, with five summits, each adorned with several sacred places, it is accessed on foot by soaring close to 10,000 steps along a rugged terrain and deciduous forest that is also the last home for Asiatic lions. It is the longest completely stone-made stairway in the world.
- Alipiri, India, is one of two ways to reach the Sri Venkateswara Swami Vaari Temple, Tirumala from Tirupati on foot, and it was until recently the only one in modern times. The temple is the richest Hindu temple in the world in terms of donations received and wealth and is visited by about 50,000 to 100,000 pilgrims per day (30 to 40 million people annually on average), while on special occasions and festivals like the annual Brahmotsavam, the number of pilgrims shoots up to 500,000, making it the most-visited holy place in the world. Srivari Mettu, about 20 km away, is the original one that was renovated and brought back to use in 2008. Alipiri is the longer route with more than 3550 steps, Srivari Mettu is shorter with 2388 steps.
- A flight of 7,200 steps (including inner temple Steps), with 6,293 Official Mountain Walkway Steps, leads up the East Peak of Mount Tai in China.
- The Haʻiku Stairs, on the island of Oʻahu, Hawaiʻi, are approximately 4,000 steps which climb nearly 1/2 mile (0.8 km). Originally used to access long wire radio antennas which were strung high above the Haʻiku Valley, between Honolulu and Kaneʻohe, they are closed to hikers.
- The Flørli stairs, in Lysefjorden, Norway, have 4,444 wooden steps that climb from sea level to 740 metres (2,428 feet). It is a maintenance stairway for the water pipeline to the old Flørli hydro plant. The hydro plant is now closed down, and the stairs are open to the public. The stairway is claimed to be the longest wooden stairway in the world.
- The longest stone stairs in Japan are the 3,333-step stairs of the Shakain temple in Yatsushiro, Kumamoto. The second ones, Mount Haguro stone stairs, have 2,446 steps in Tsuruoka, Yamagata.
- The CN Tower's staircase reaches the main deck level after 1,776 steps and the Sky Pod above after 2,579 steps; it is the tallest metal staircase on Earth.
- The Gemonian stairs were infamous as a place of execution during the early Roman Empire, especially during the period postdating Tiberius.
- The World Trade Center Survivors' Staircase is the last visible structure above ground level at the World Trade Center site. It was originally two outdoor flights of granite-clad stairs and an escalator that connected Vesey Street to the World Trade Center's Austin J. Tobin Plaza. During the September 11, 2001, attacks, the stairs served as an escape route for hundreds of evacuees from 5 World Trade Center, a 9-floor building adjacent to the 110-story towers. Stairwell A was the lone stairway left intact after the second plane hit the South Tower of the World Trade Center during the September 11 attacks. It was believed to have remained intact until the South Tower collapsed at 9:59 am. 14 people were able to escape the floors located at the impact zone (including one man who saw the plane coming at him), and 4 people from the floors above the impact zone. Numerous 911 operators who received calls from individuals inside the South Tower were not well informed of the situation as it rapidly unfolded in the South Tower. Many operators told callers not to descend the tower on their own, even though it is now believed that Stairwell A was most likely passable at and above the point of impact.
- In London, England, a notable staircase is that to the Monument to the Great Fire of London, more commonly known simply as "the Monument". This is a column in the City of London, near the northern end of London Bridge, which commemorates the Great Fire of London. The top of the Monument is reached by a narrow winding staircase of 311 steps. Constructed between 1671 and 1677, it is the tallest isolated stone column in the world.
- The Spanish Steps in Rome are a monument of late Italian Baroque architecture connecting the Piazza di Spagna with the Trinità dei Monti up the side of the Pincian Hill. Designed by Francesco De Sanctis and constructed 1723–1725, the 135 steps form a wide vista looking down toward the Tiber. The steps are adorned with garden terraces blooming with azaleas and have been widely celebrated in cultural work.
- The Loretto Chapel in Santa Fe, New Mexico, is well known for its helix-shaped staircase, which has been nicknamed "Miraculous Stair". It has been the subject of legend and rumor, and the circumstances surrounding its construction and its builder are considered miraculous by the Sisters of Loretto and many visitors.
- The El Toro 20, a twenty-step set of stairs in Lake Forest, California, was well known among skateboarders, BMXers, and inline skaters as a popular and challenging skate spot. The first skateboarder to do an ollie down it was Don Nguyen. The staircase was demolished in 2019.
- The Grand Staircase of the Titanic was one of the most recognizable features of the British transatlantic ocean liner that sank on her maiden voyage in 1912 after a collision with an iceberg.
- Decorated stair risers were used extensively in the Greco-Buddhist art of Gandhara, to form the pedestal to small devotional stupas. They were usually adorned with friezes, fantastic animals and decorations. A flight of stairs with decorated stair risers from the Chakhil-i-Ghoundi Stupa has been almost fully restored and can now be seen at the Guimet Museum in Paris. Archaeological research by the Italian IsMEO at the Butkara Stupa suggests that small decorative stairs were adjoined to Buddhist stupas at the time of the Indo-Greek Kingdom, and that they were decorated with Buddhist scenes.
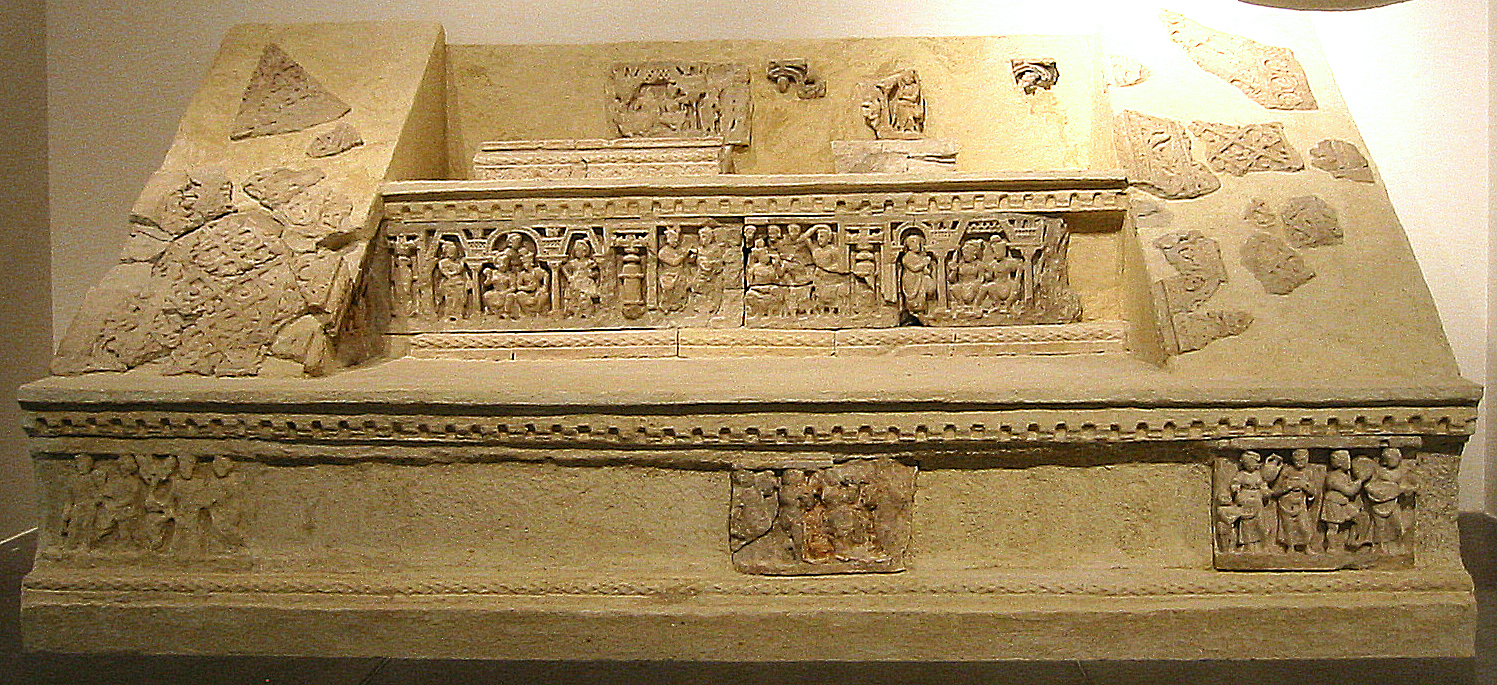
A reconstituted flight of stairs with stair risers, from the Chakhil-i-Ghoundi Stupa

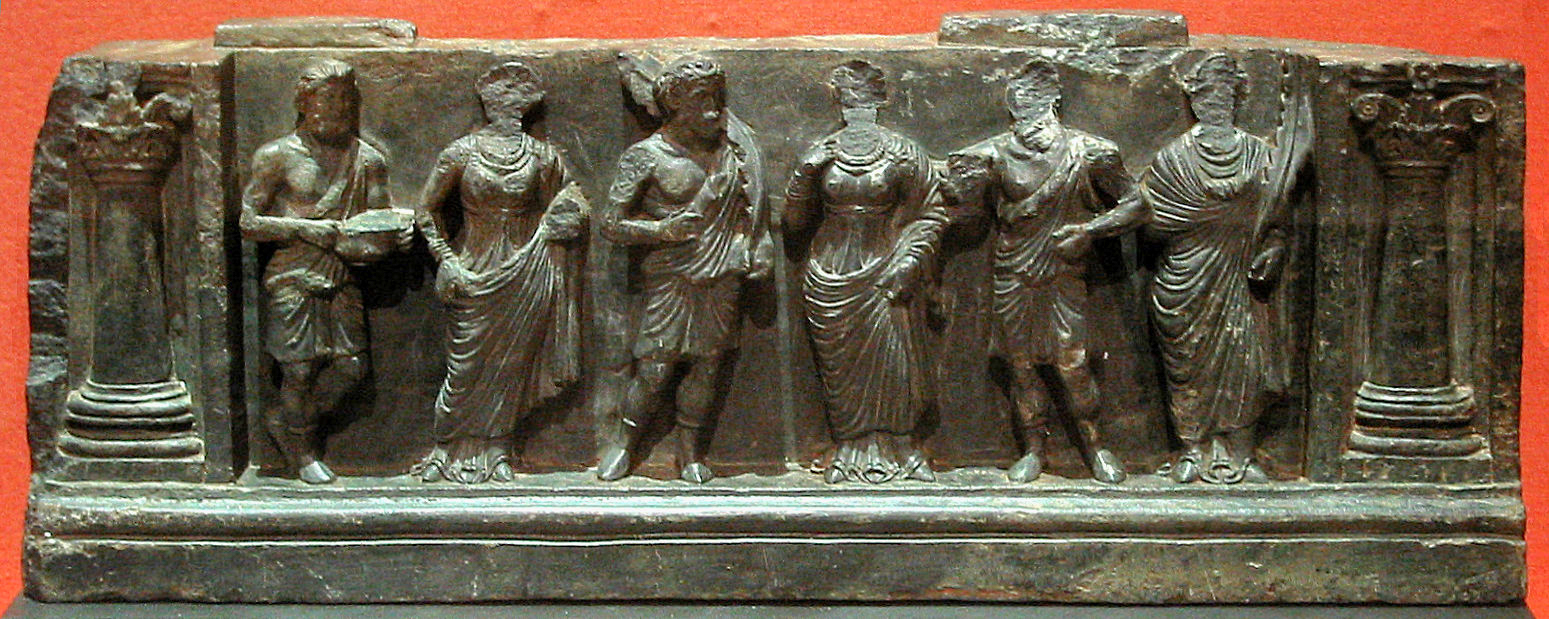
A Gandharan Buner relief of a stair riser with devotees (1st–2nd century CE), Victoria and Albert Museum collection

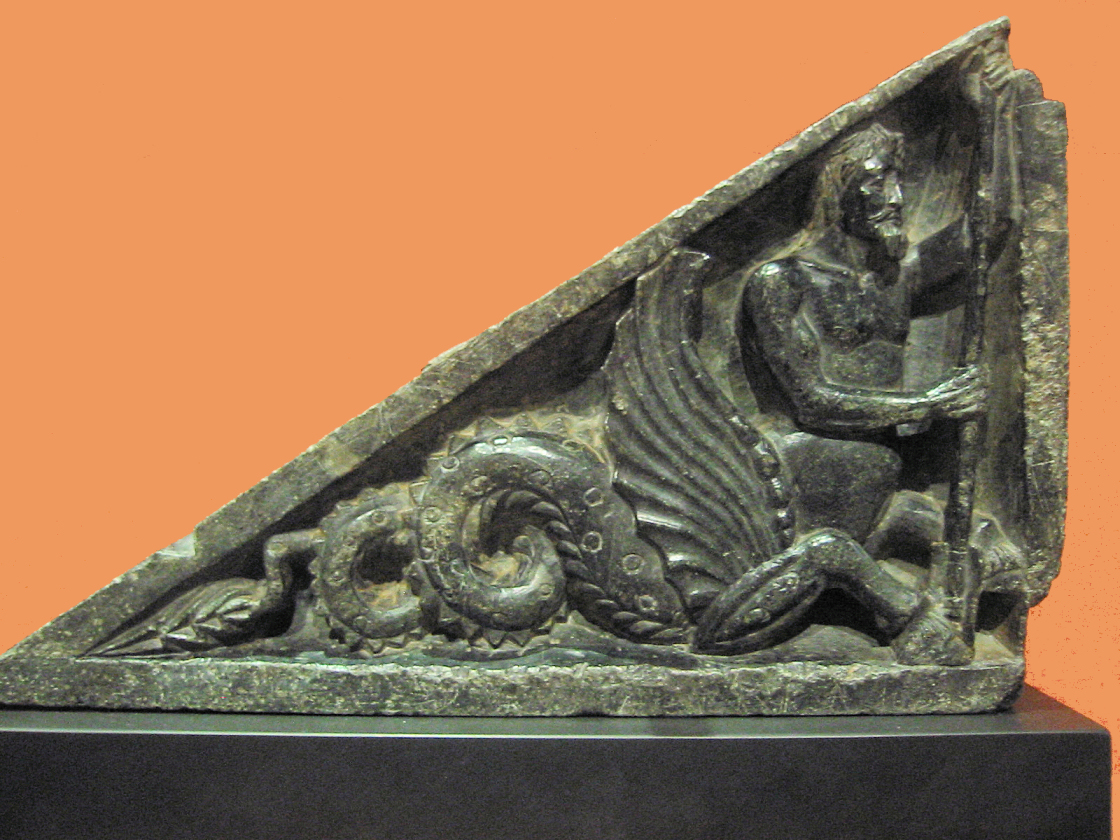
A side stair riser depicting an Ichthyo-Centaur, also considered as a Buner relief

== Gallery ==
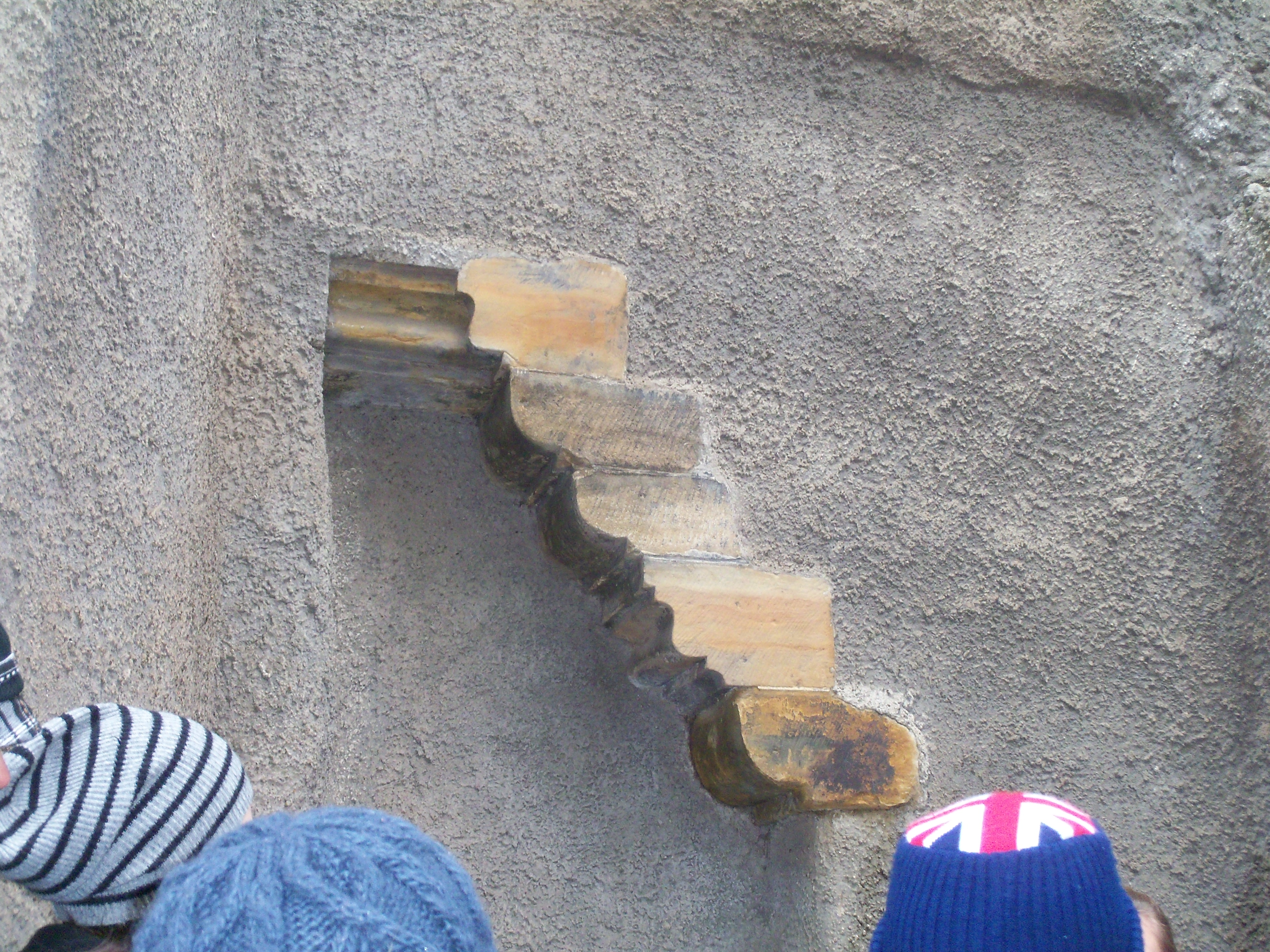
An early kind of burglar alarm – trip stairs. The idea was that the unexpected change in the level of the stairs would foil the would-be robbers by causing them to trip in the darkness and wake someone.

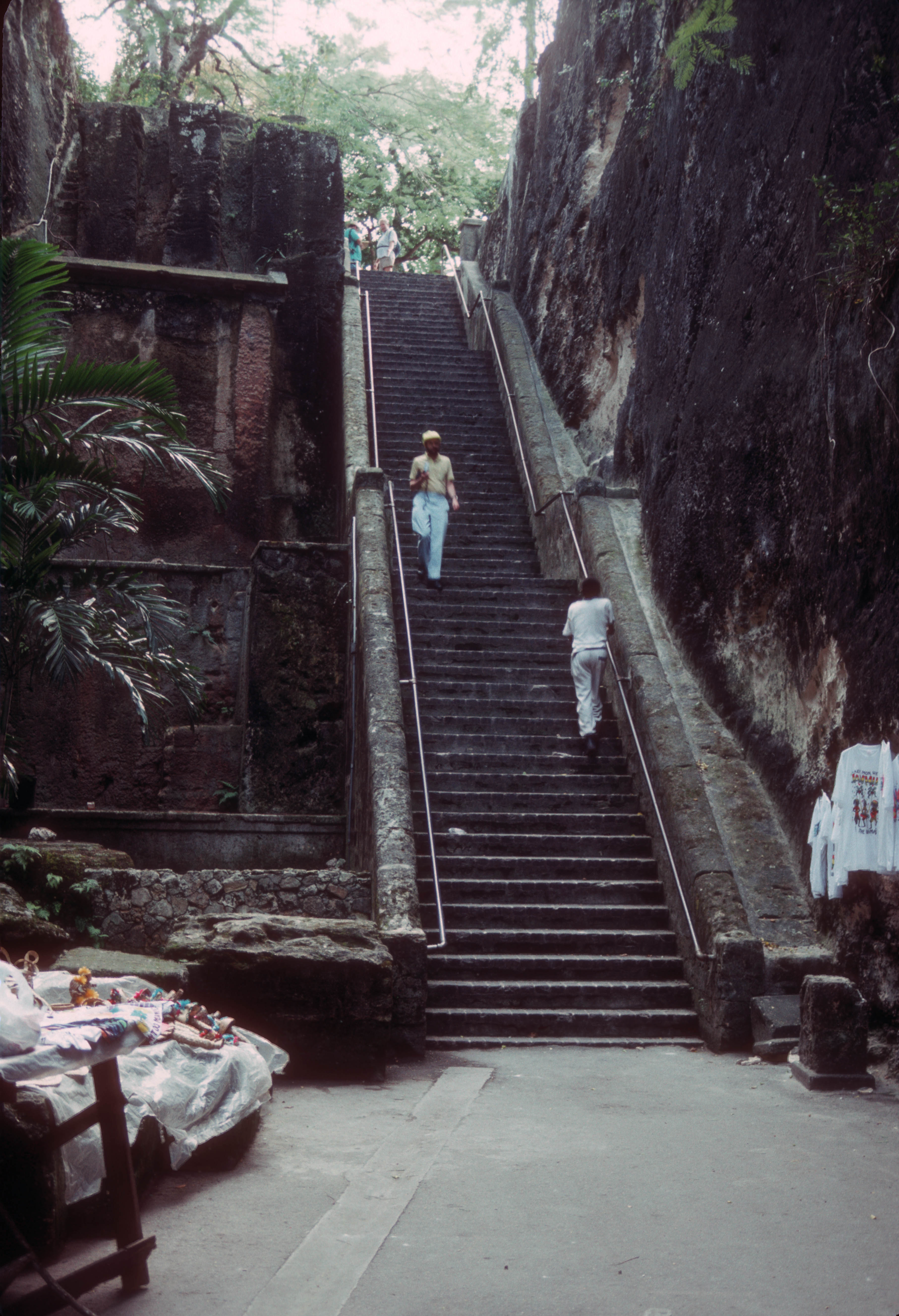
66 steps Queen's Staircase in Nassau, Bahamas

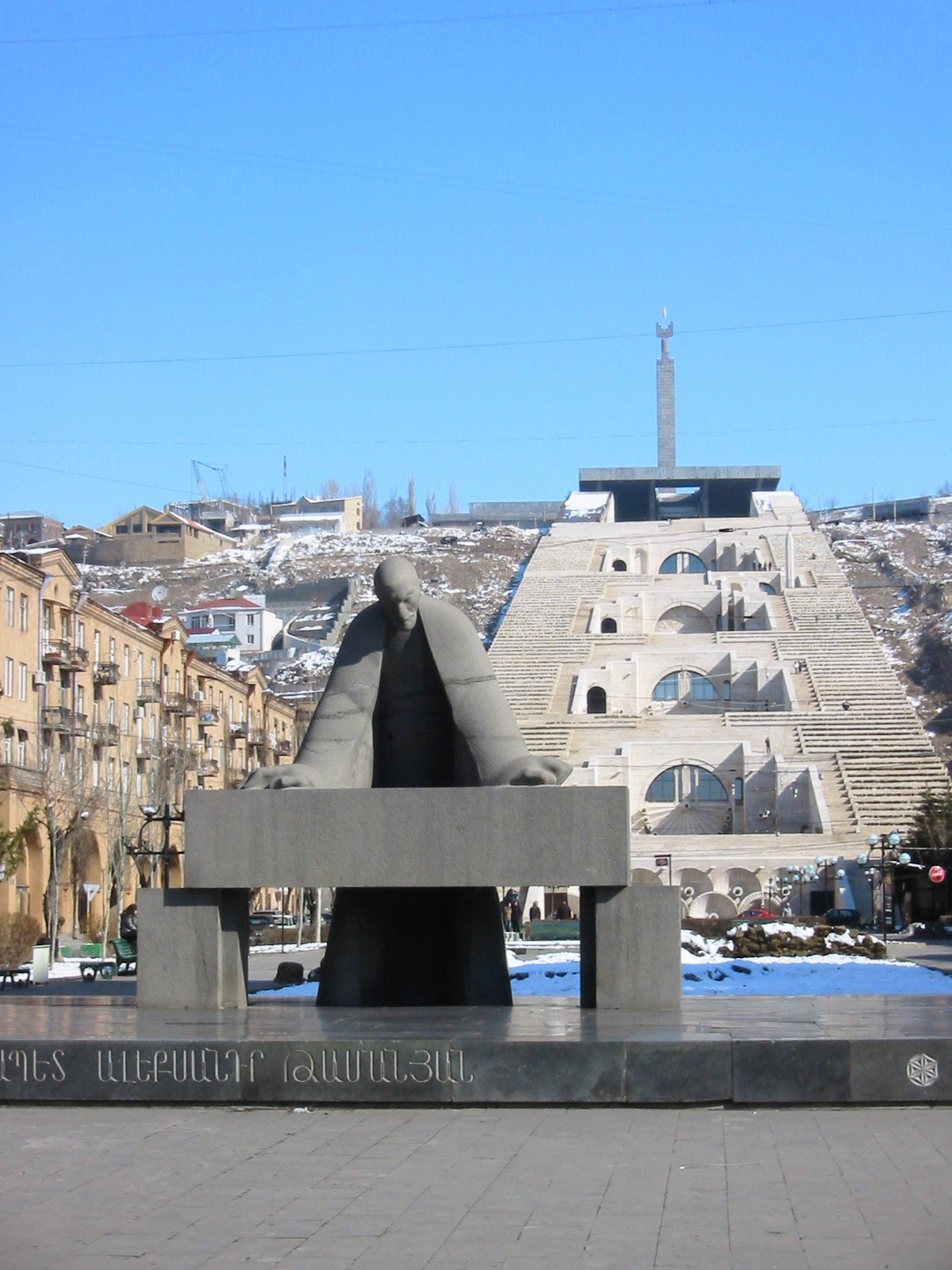
Yerevan Cascade steps (572 steps) in Yerevan, Armenia

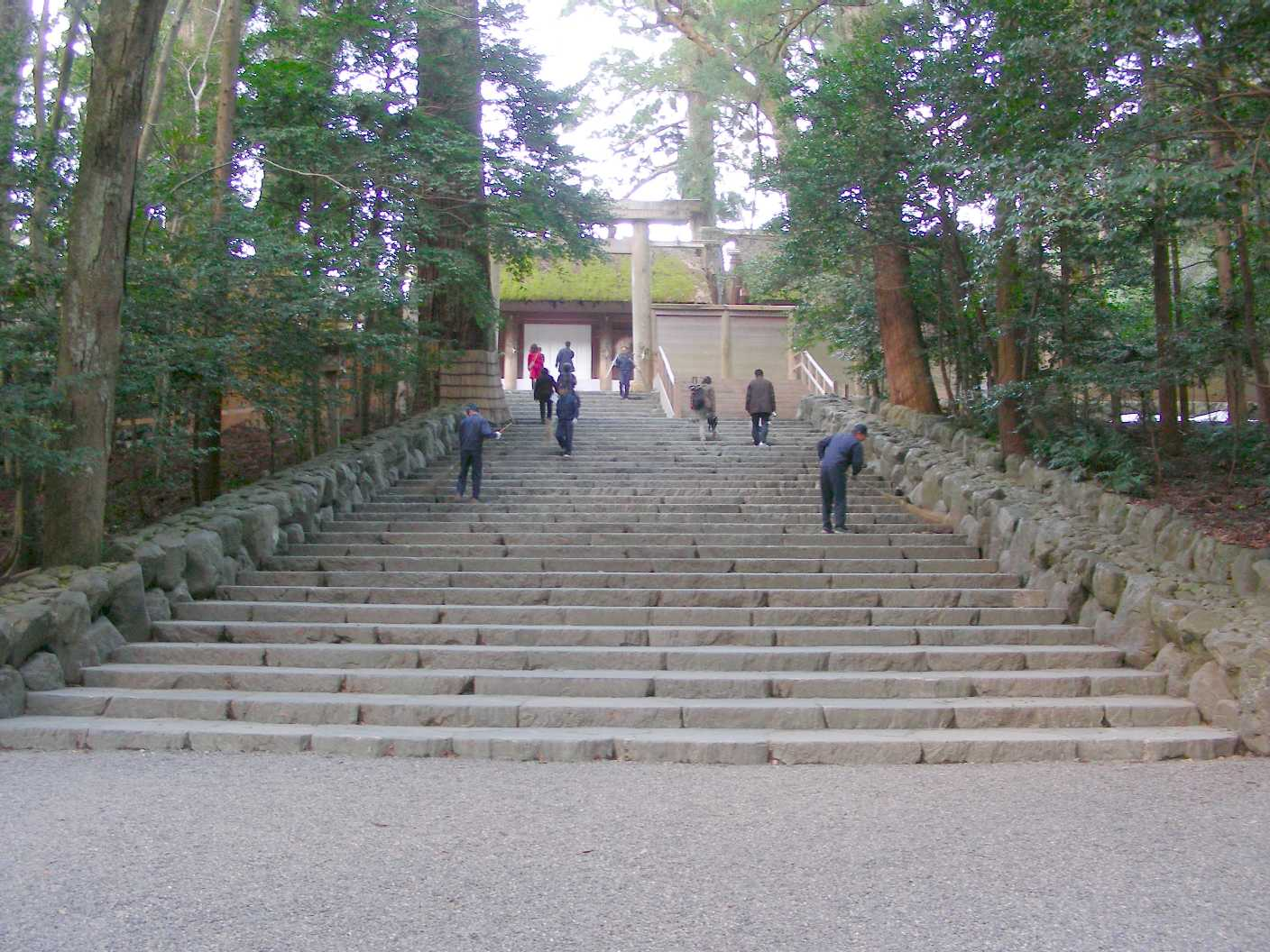
Ise Jingu in Japan

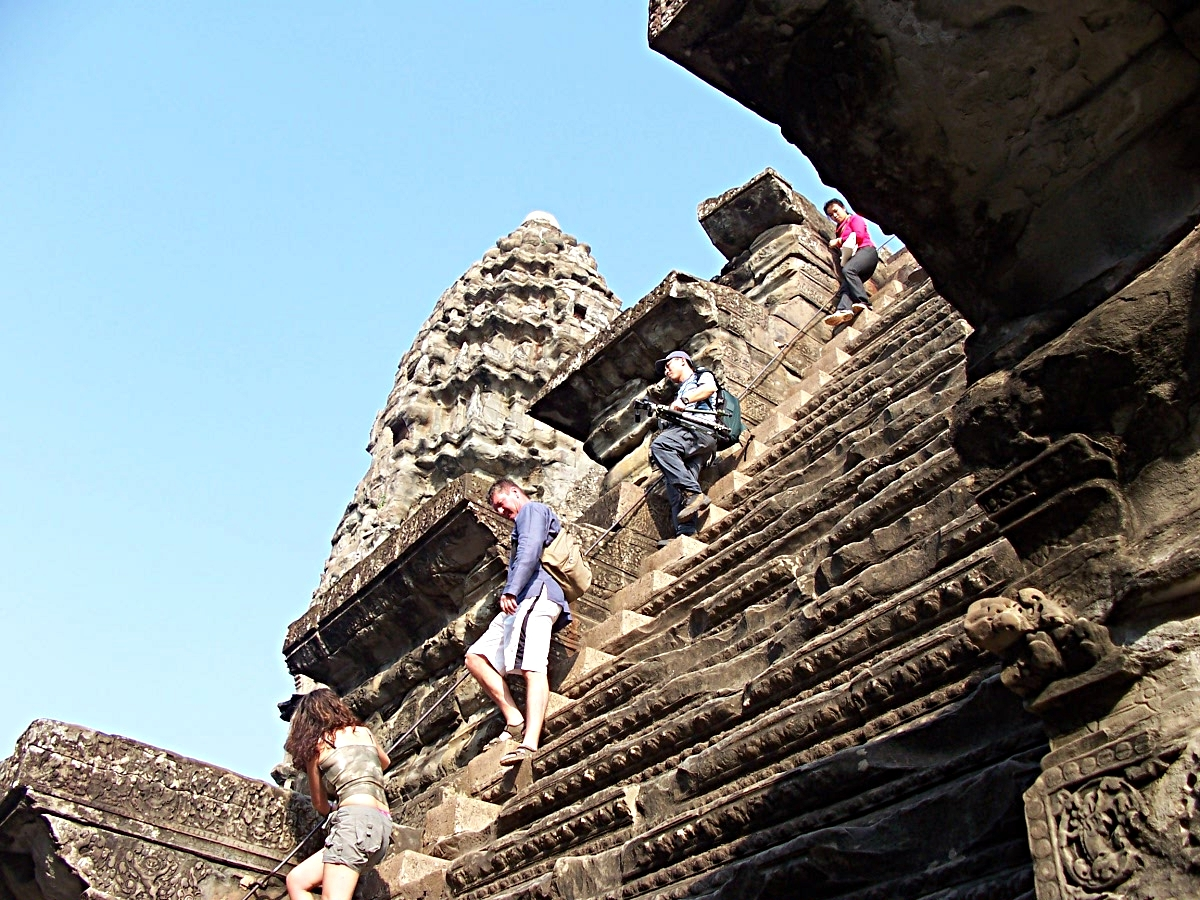
Angkor Wat in Cambodia

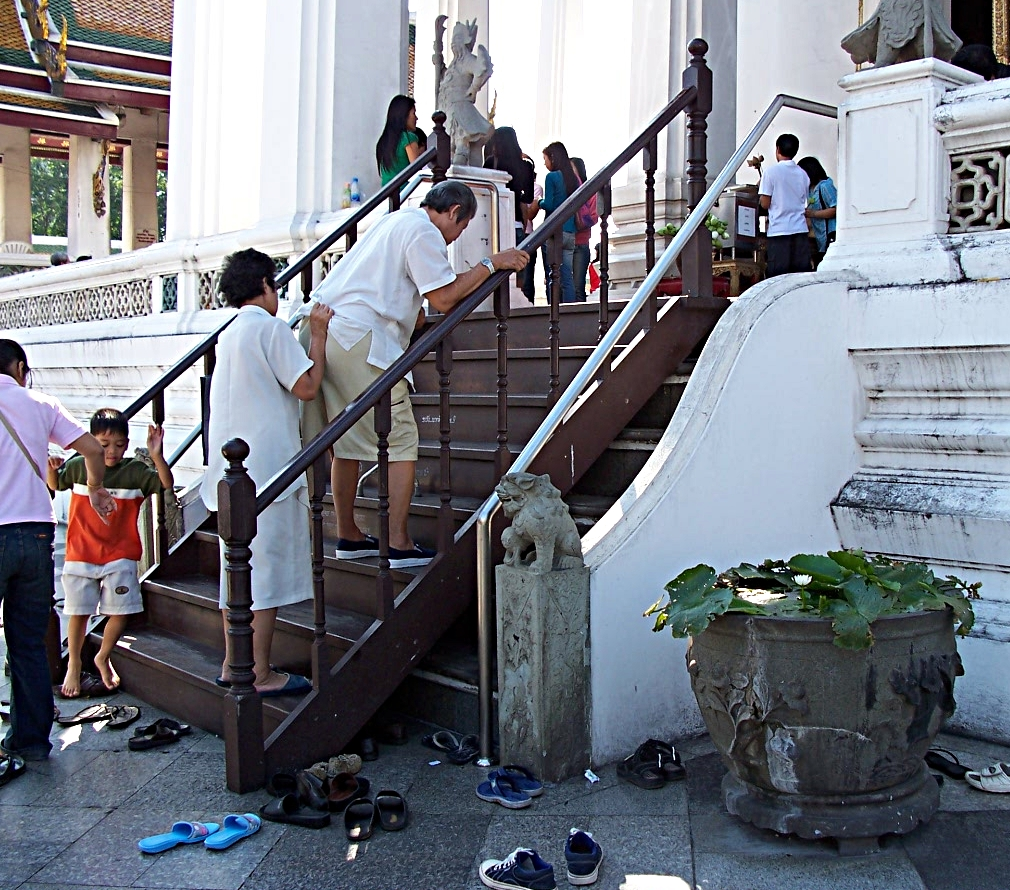
Modified stairway for the elderly in Thailand

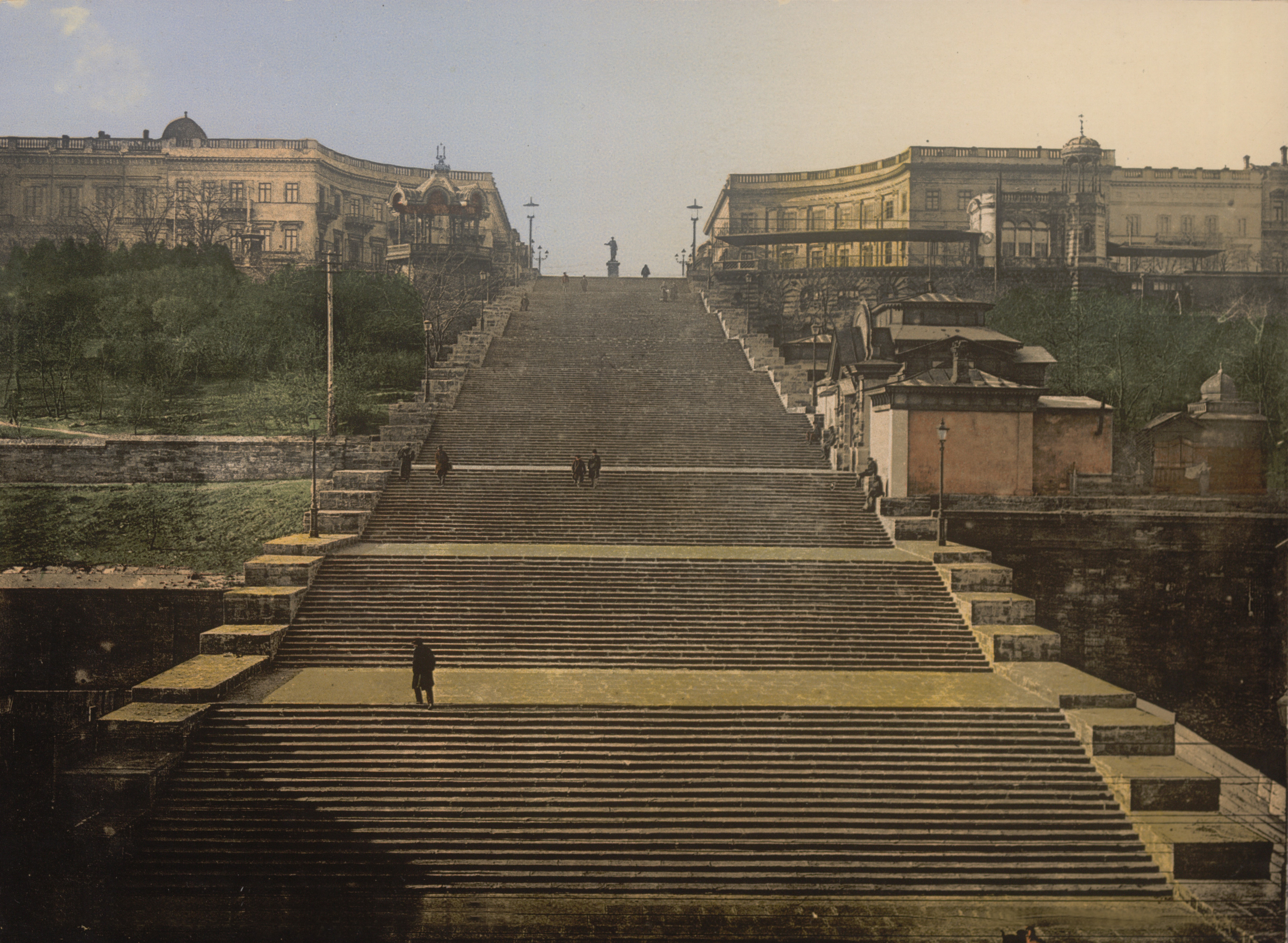
The Potemkin Stairs (1834–1841) in Odesa, Ukraine

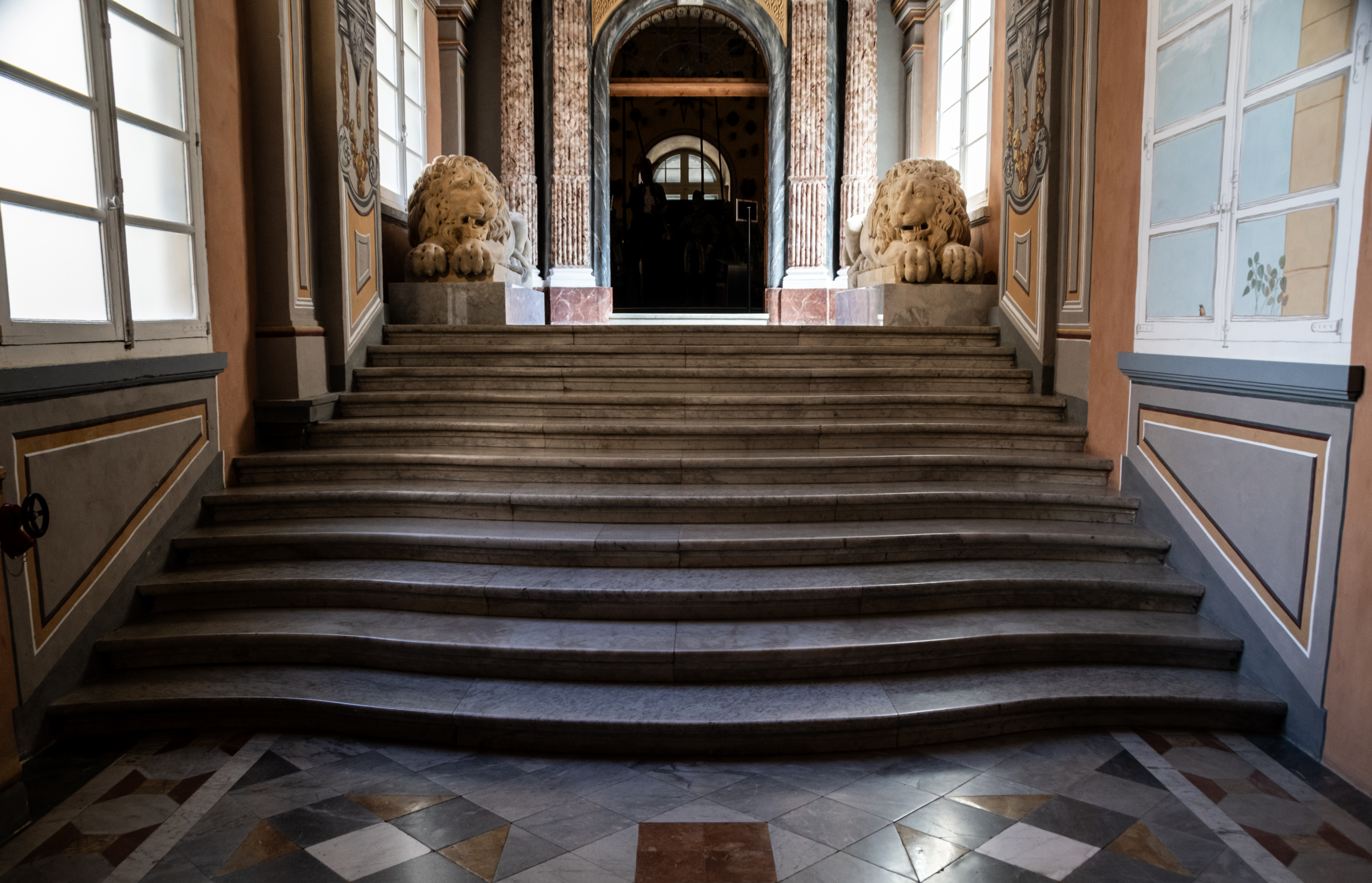
Curved stairs inside the Grandmaster's Palace in Valletta, Malta

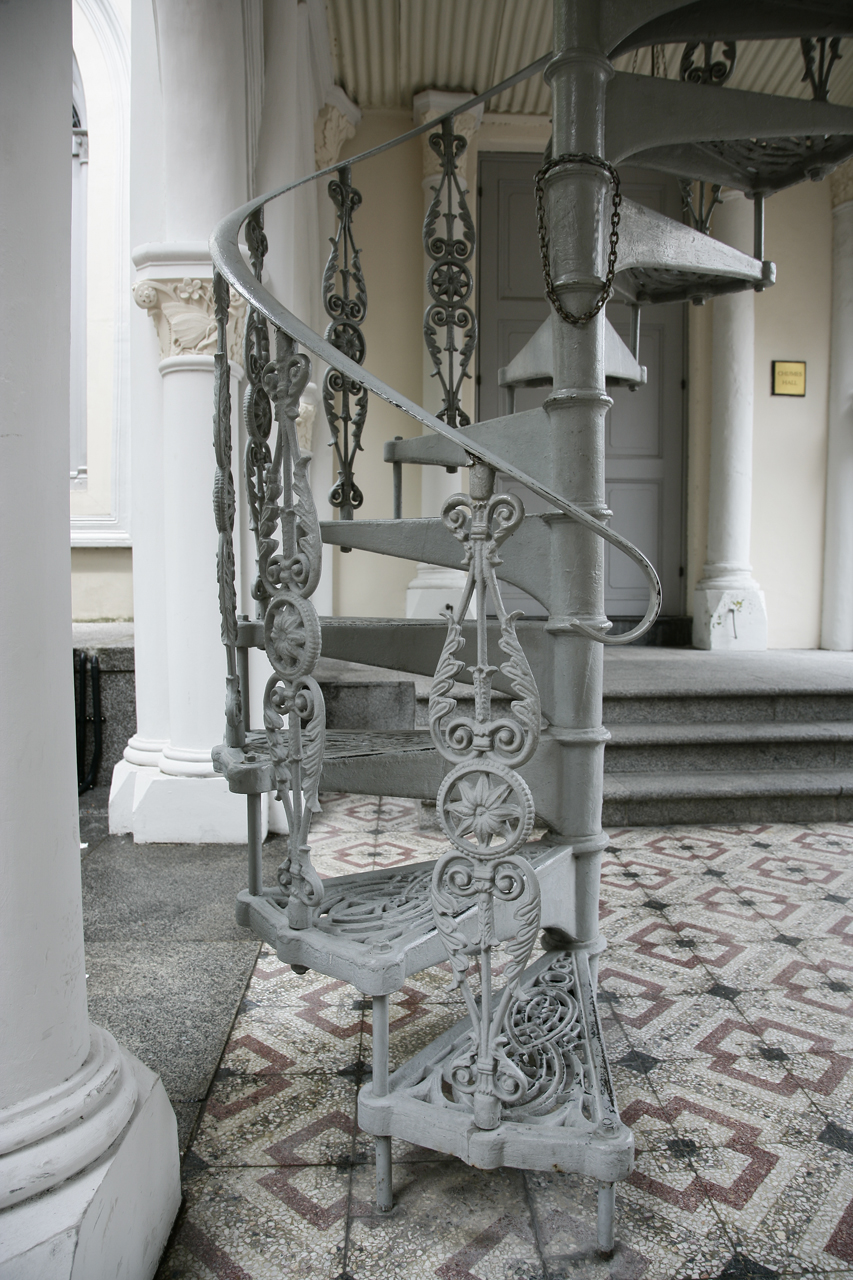
Helical stairs with ornamental balusters

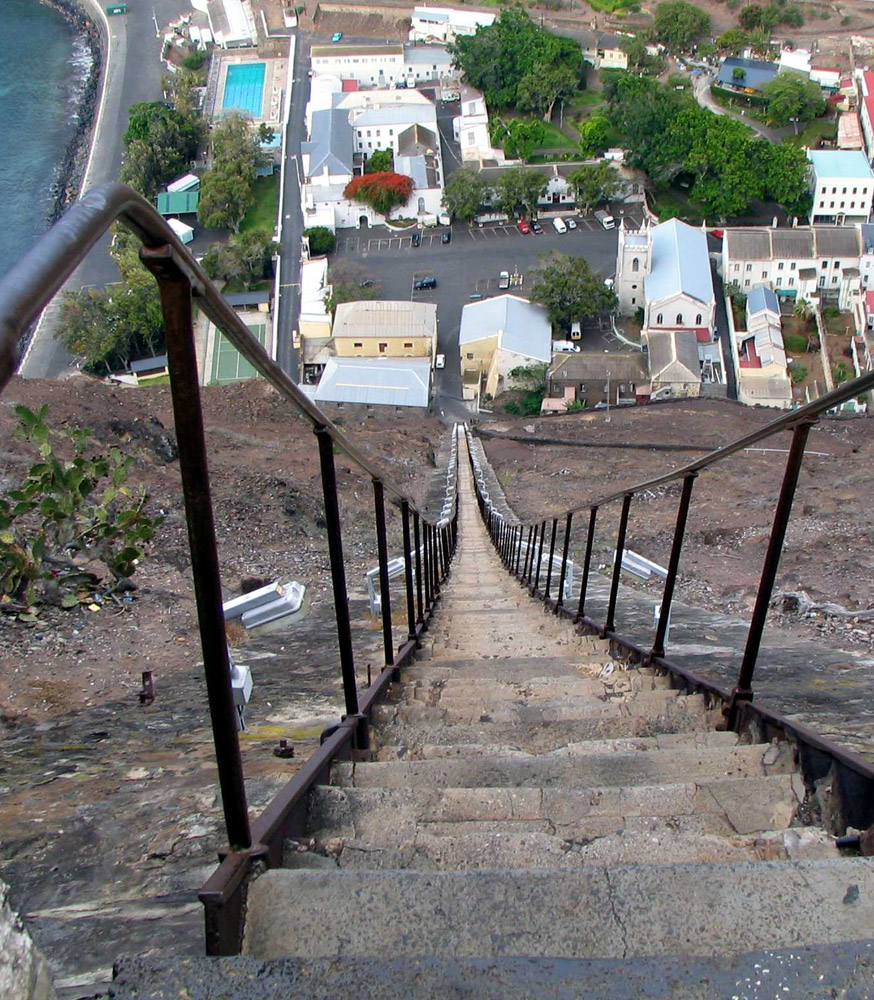
The Jacob's Ladder, between Jamestown and Half Tree Hollow, in Saint Helena

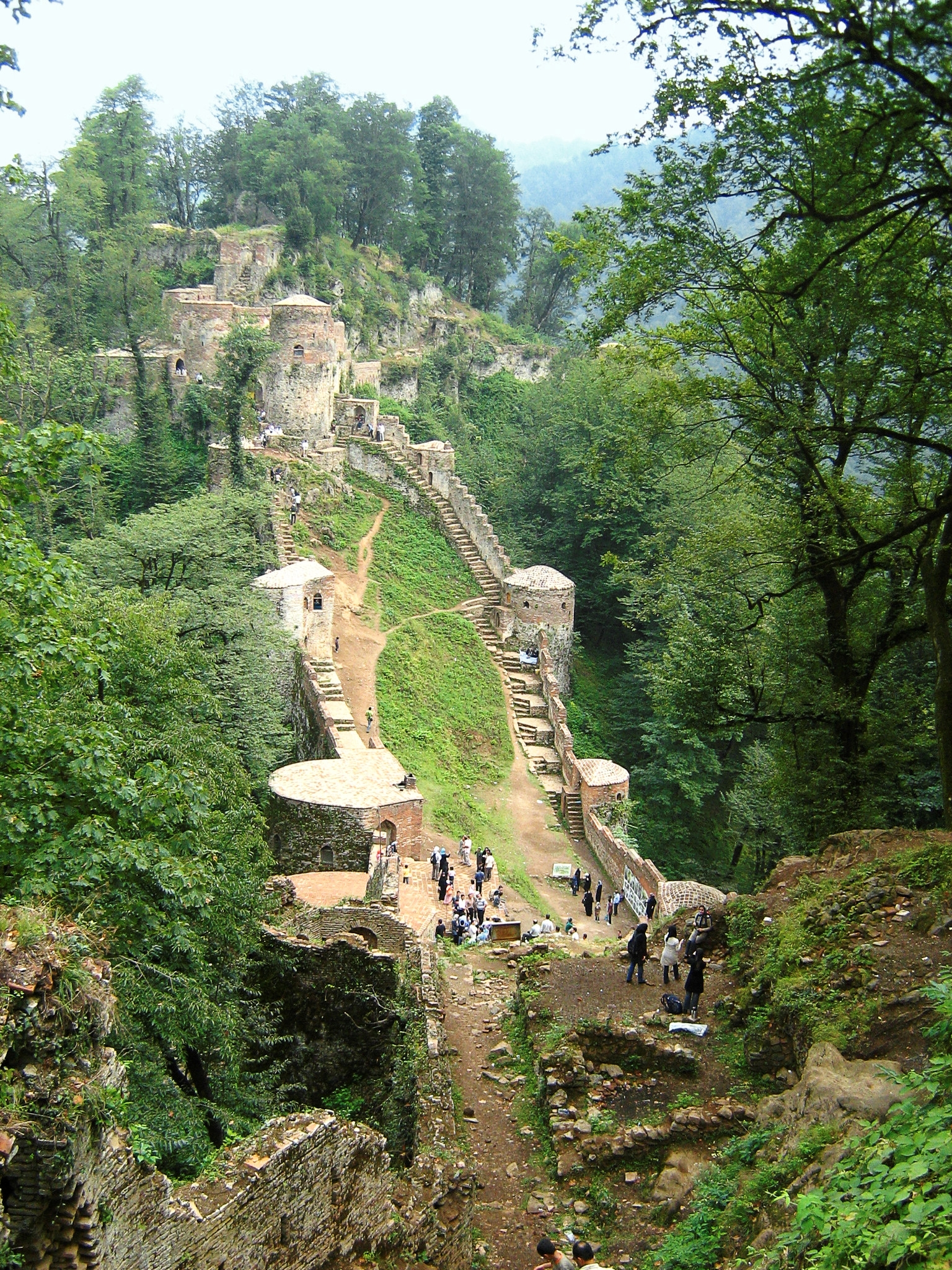
Rudkhan Castle, Fouman, Iran

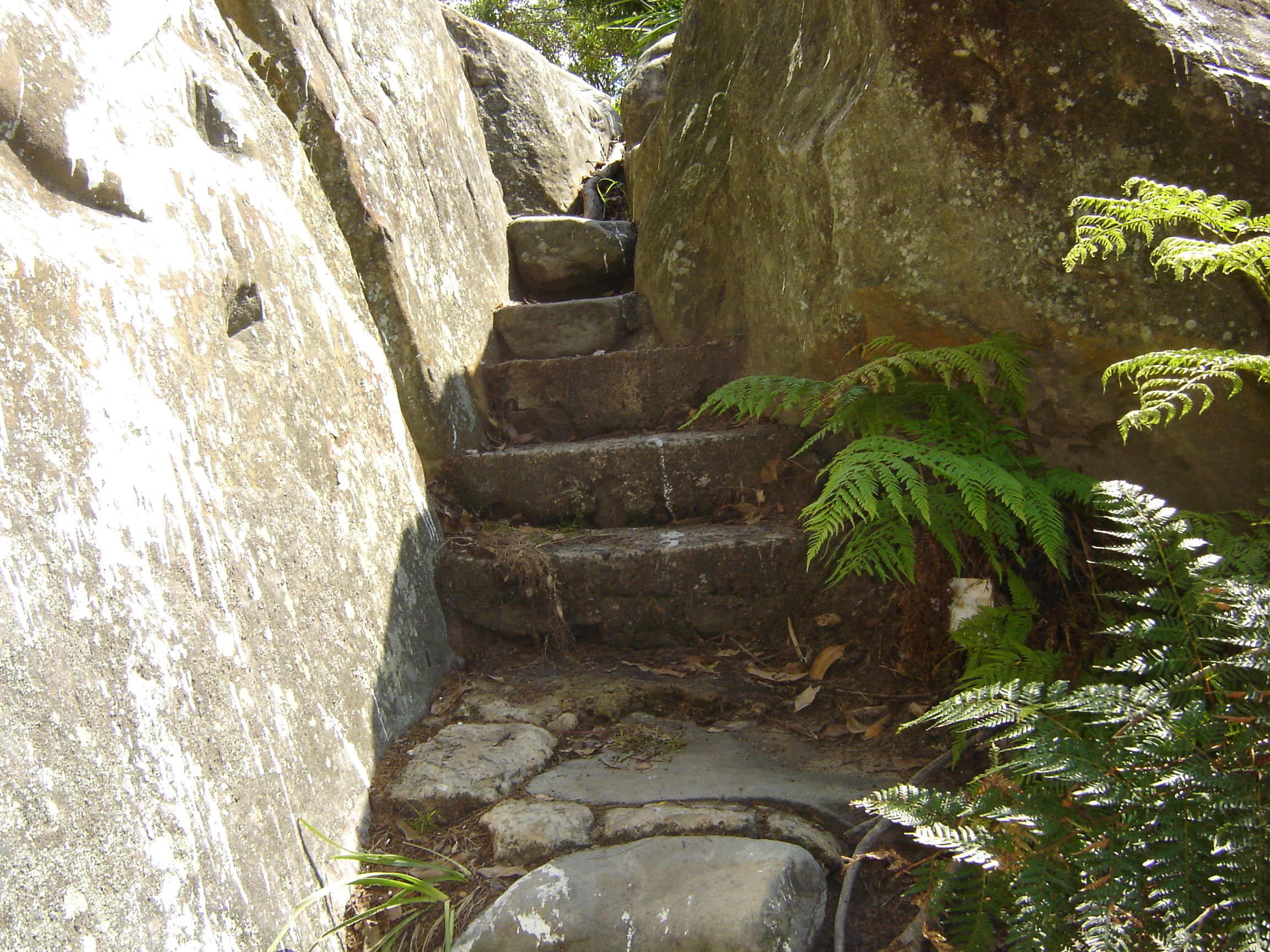
Stairs of rock placed in a natural passage

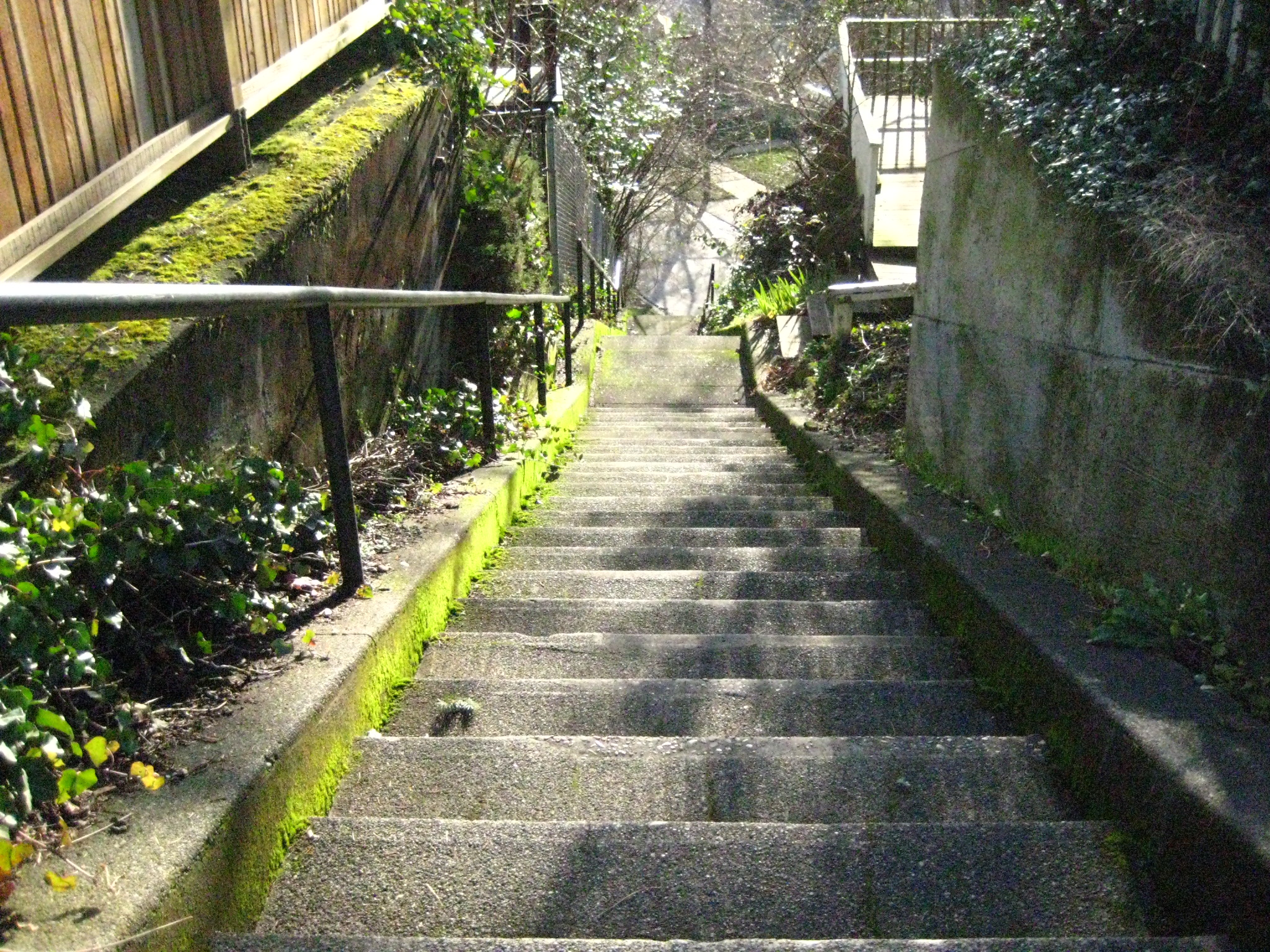
Outdoor stairway on the Alameda Ridge in Portland, Oregon, United States

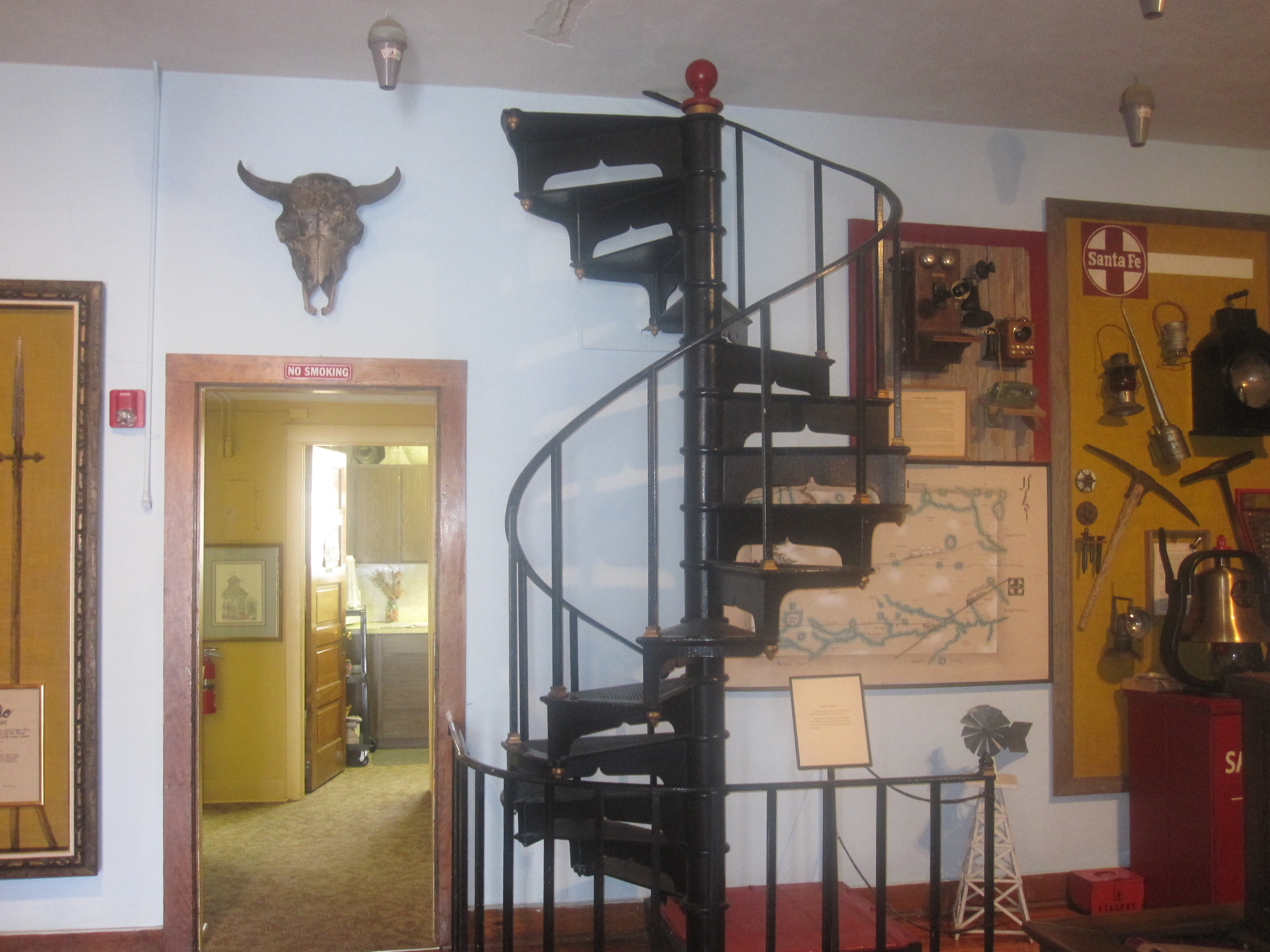
Pioneer helical staircase, Deaf Smith County Historical Museum, Hereford, Texas, United States

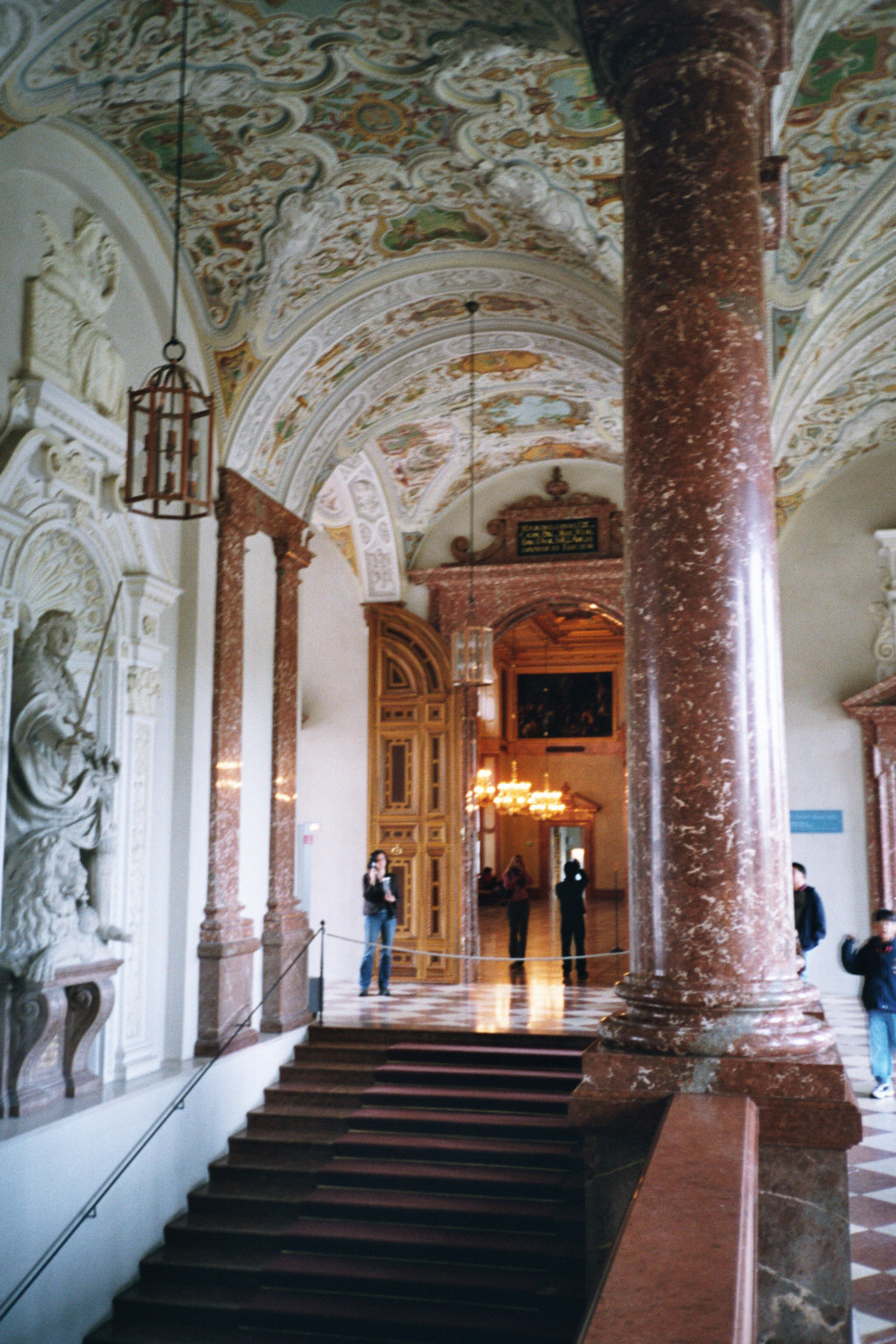
Emperor's Stairs in the Residenz of Munich, Bavaria, Germany

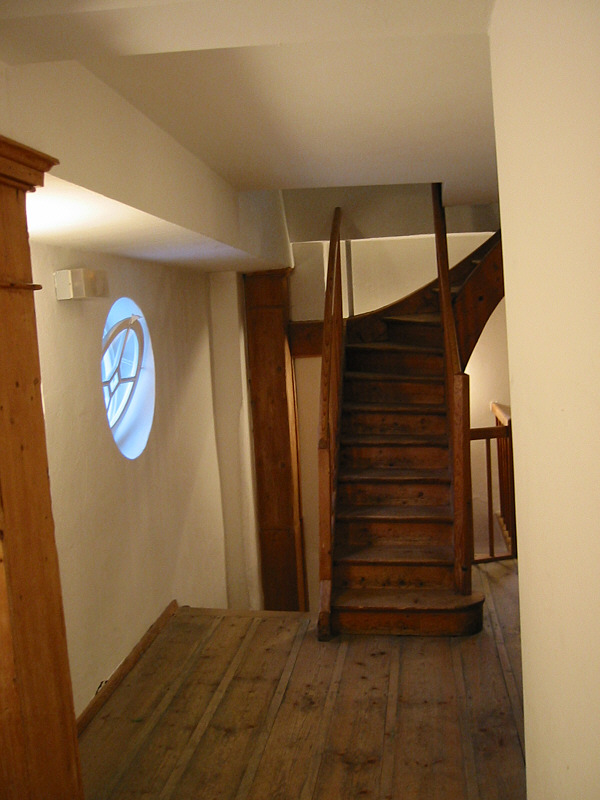
The 19th century theatre of Weißenhorn, Germany

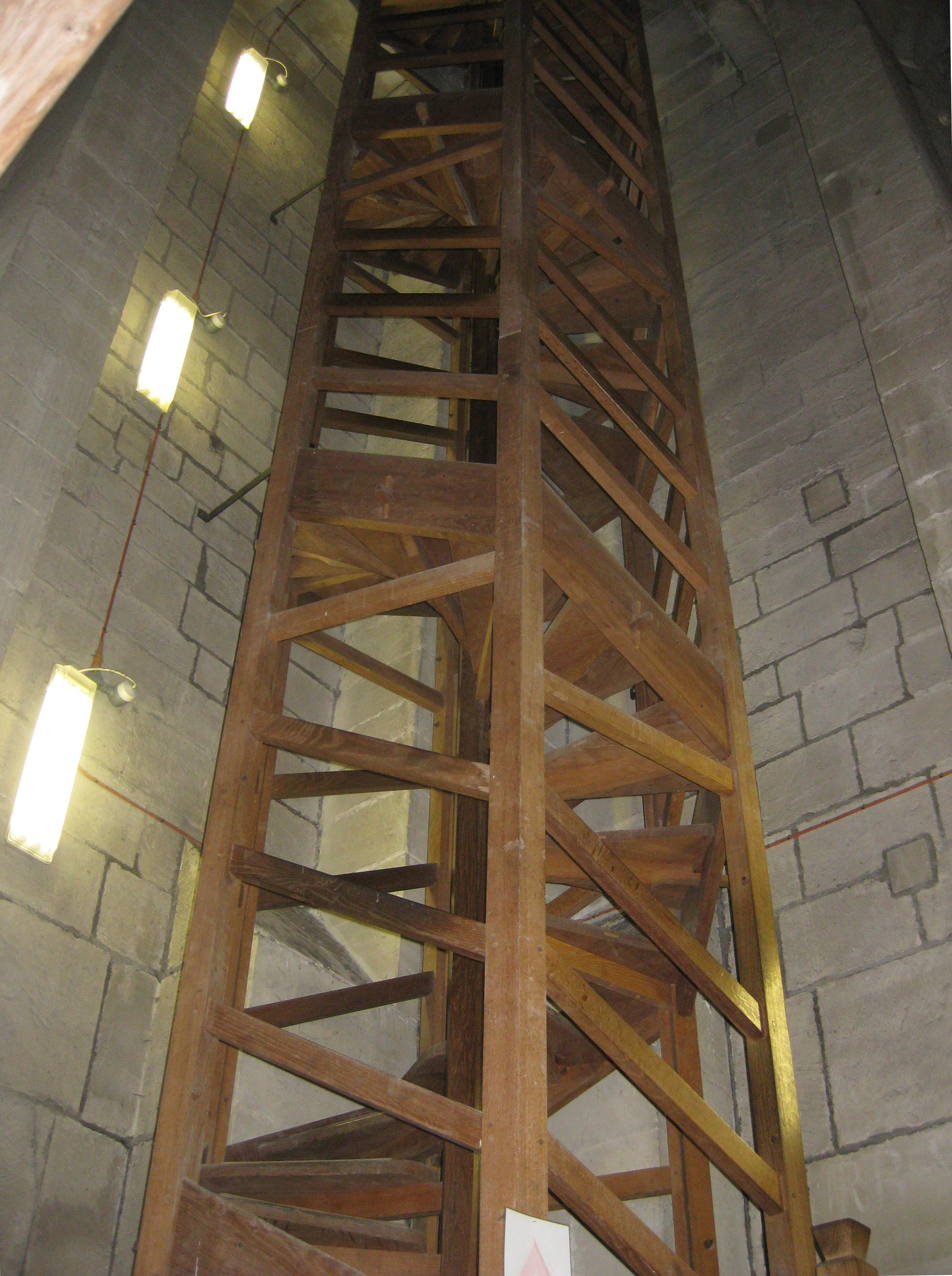
Wooden helical stairs in the tower of Salisbury Cathedral, England

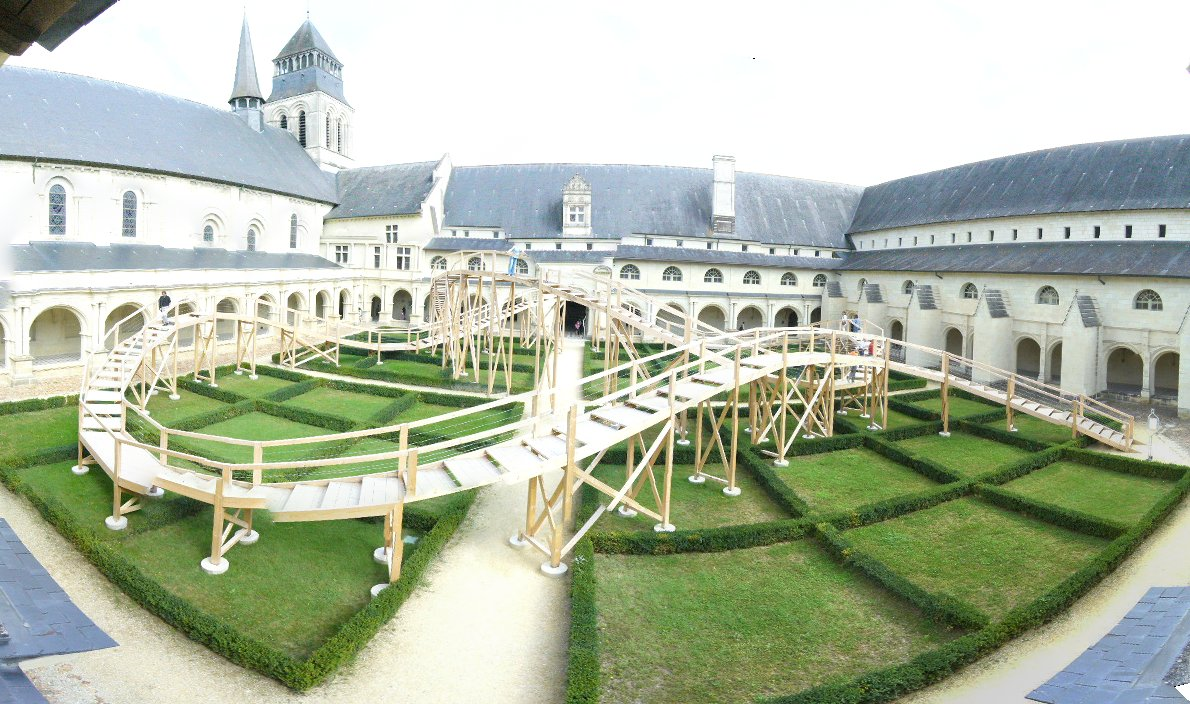
A stair and a sculpture in the Fontevraud Abbey

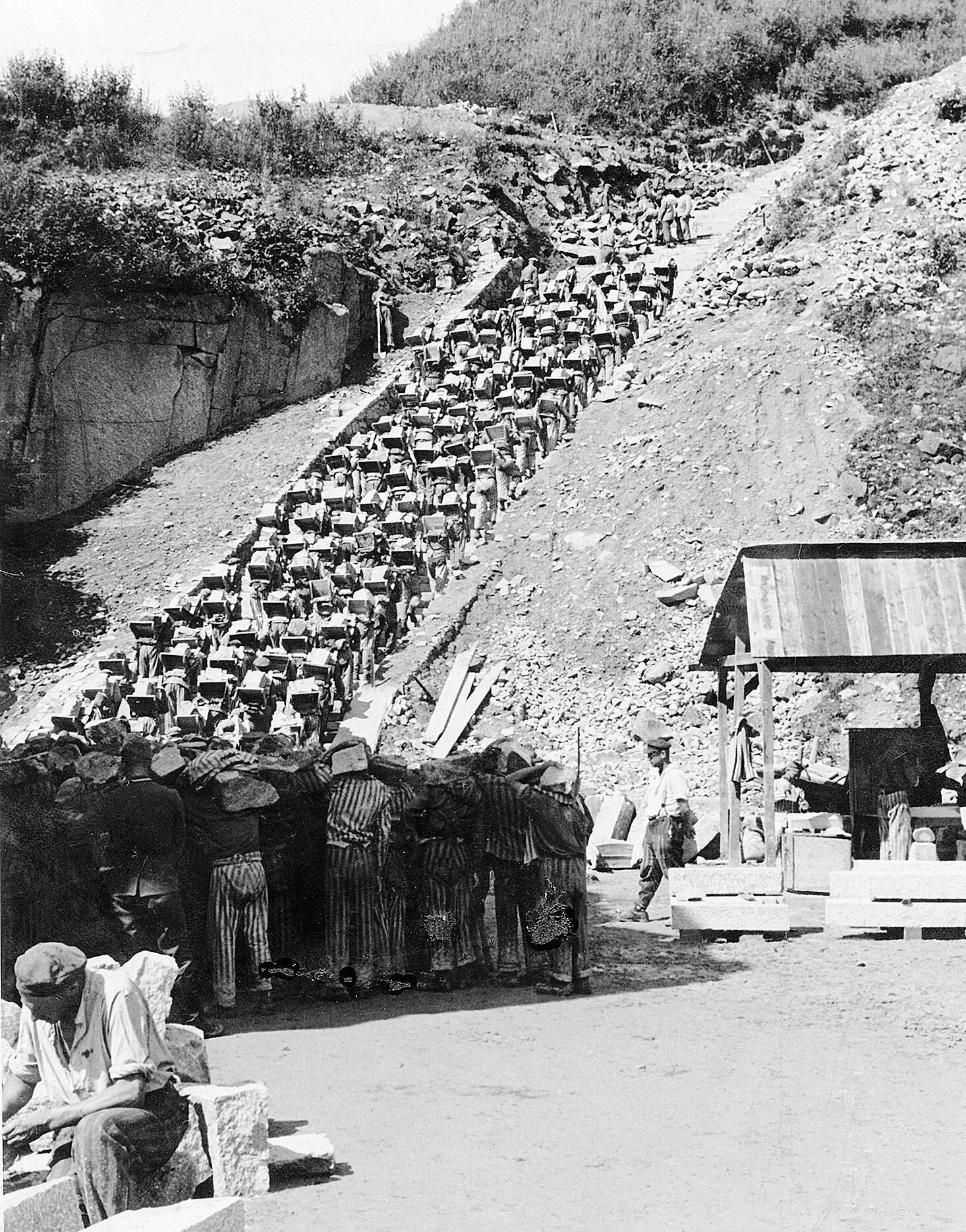
Stairs of Death Concentration camp Mauthausen; prisoners in the quarry

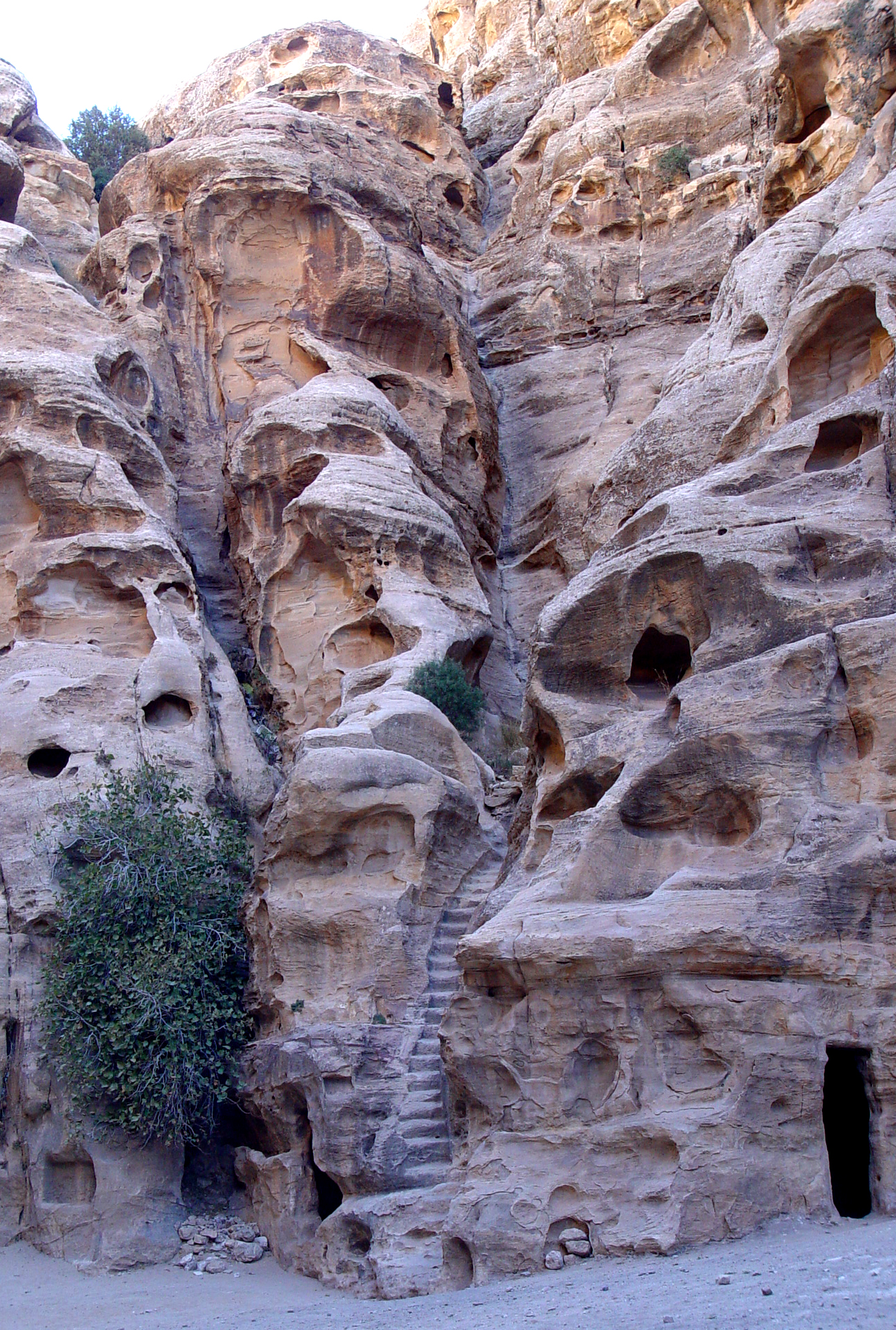
Nabataean stairway in Beida ("Little Petra"), Jordan

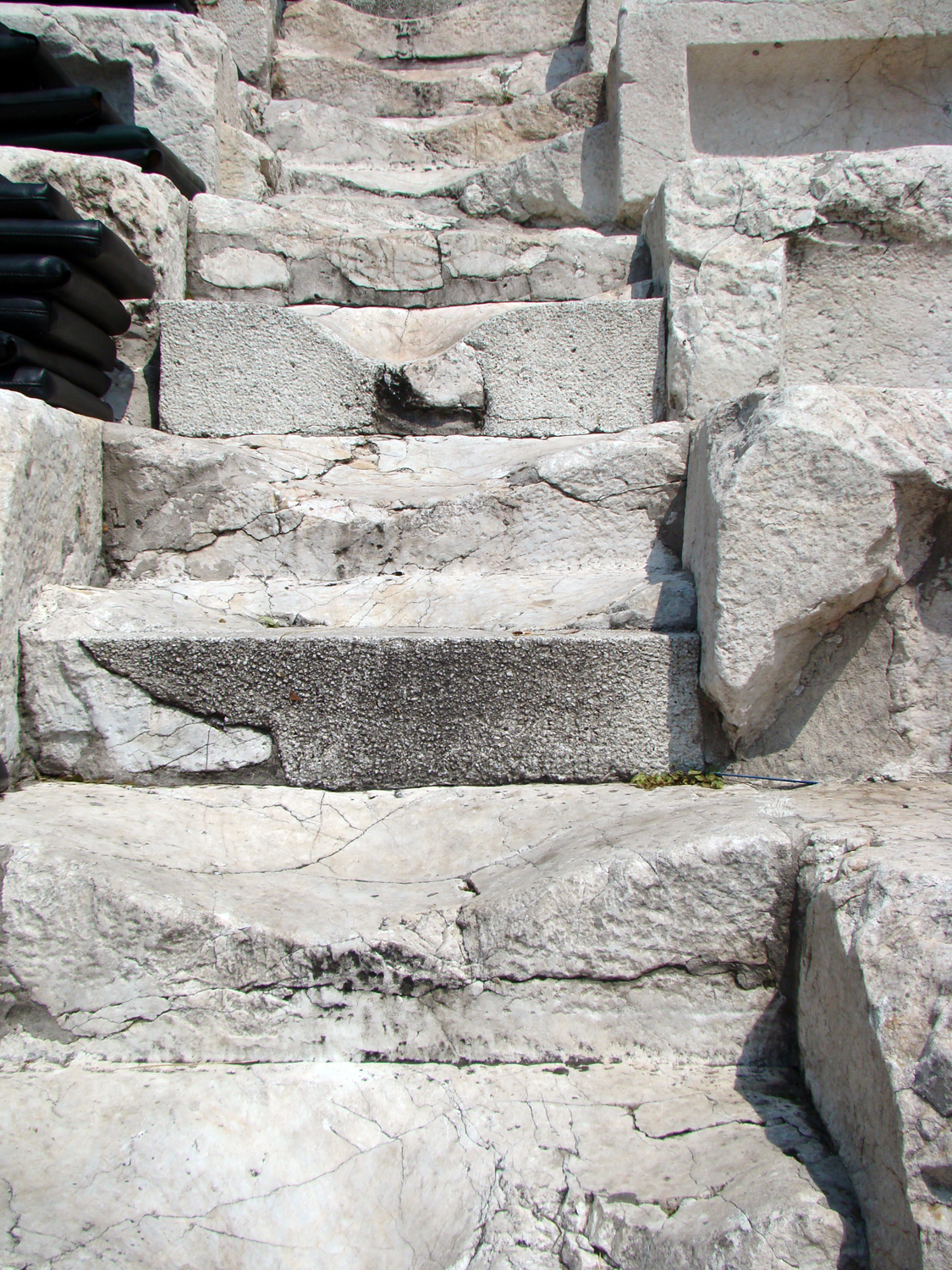
Foot-worn staircase of the Plovdiv Roman amphitheatre showing multiple repairs

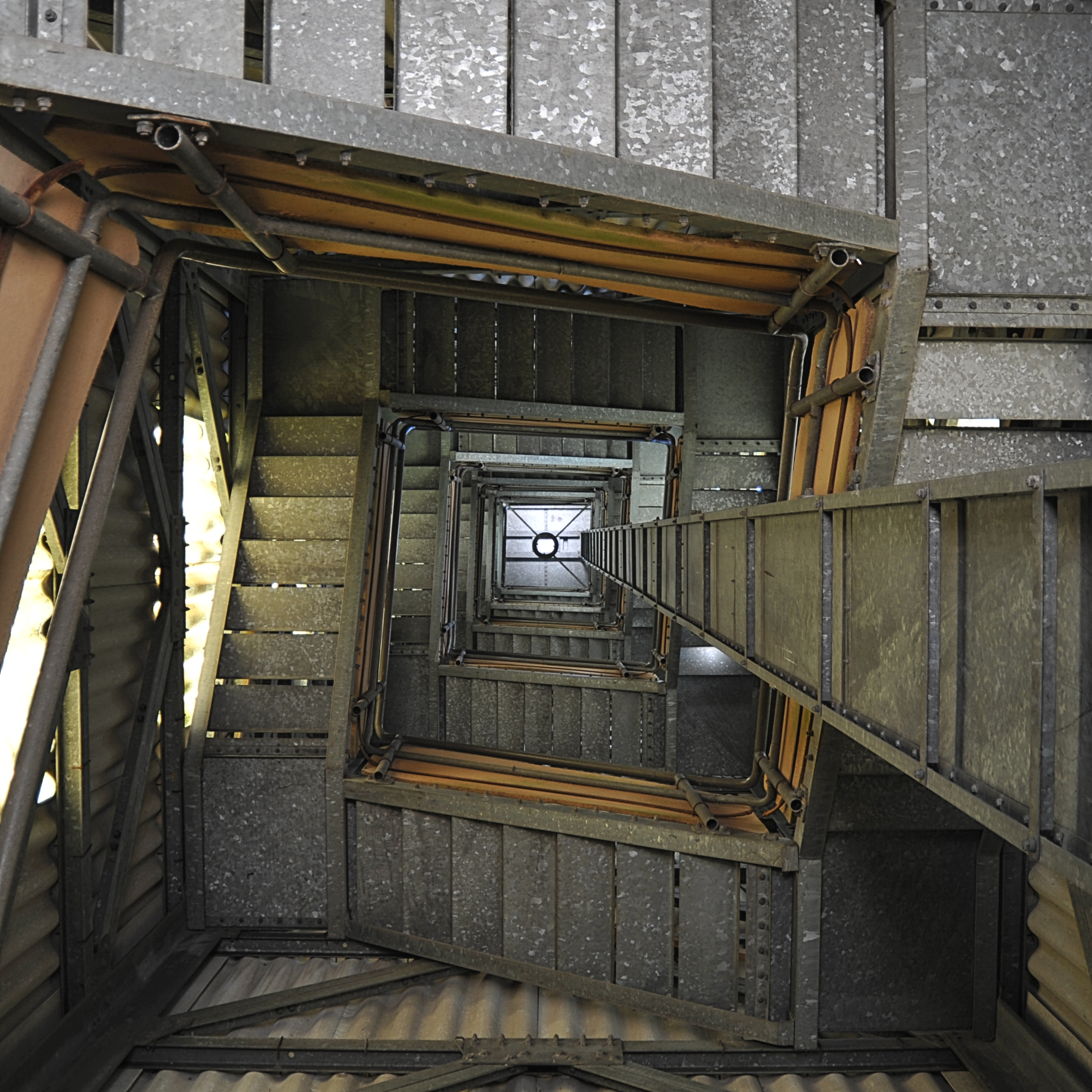
Square steel staircase in German look-out tower Klausenturm

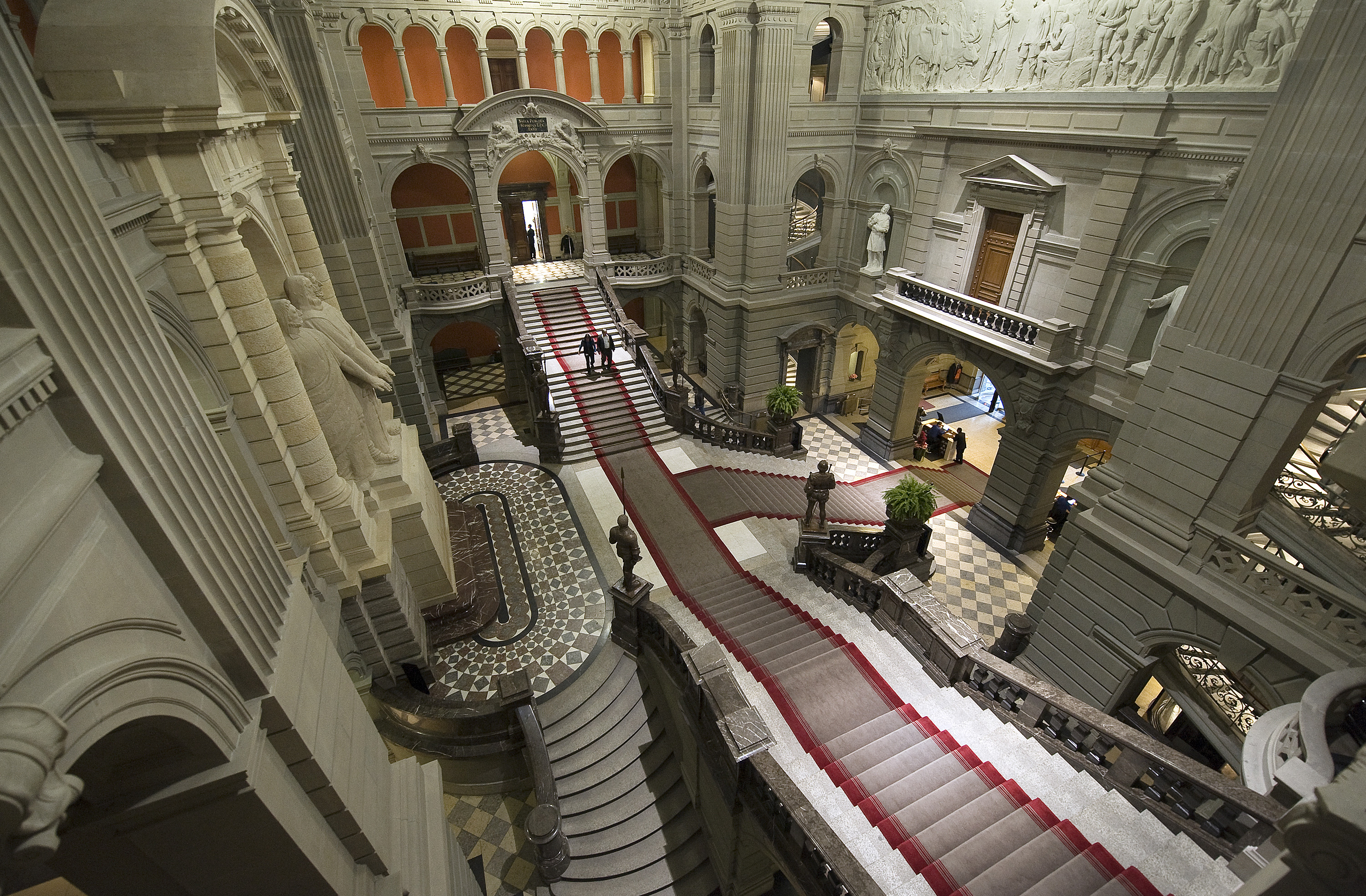
Multiple stairs inside the Federal Palace of Switzerland

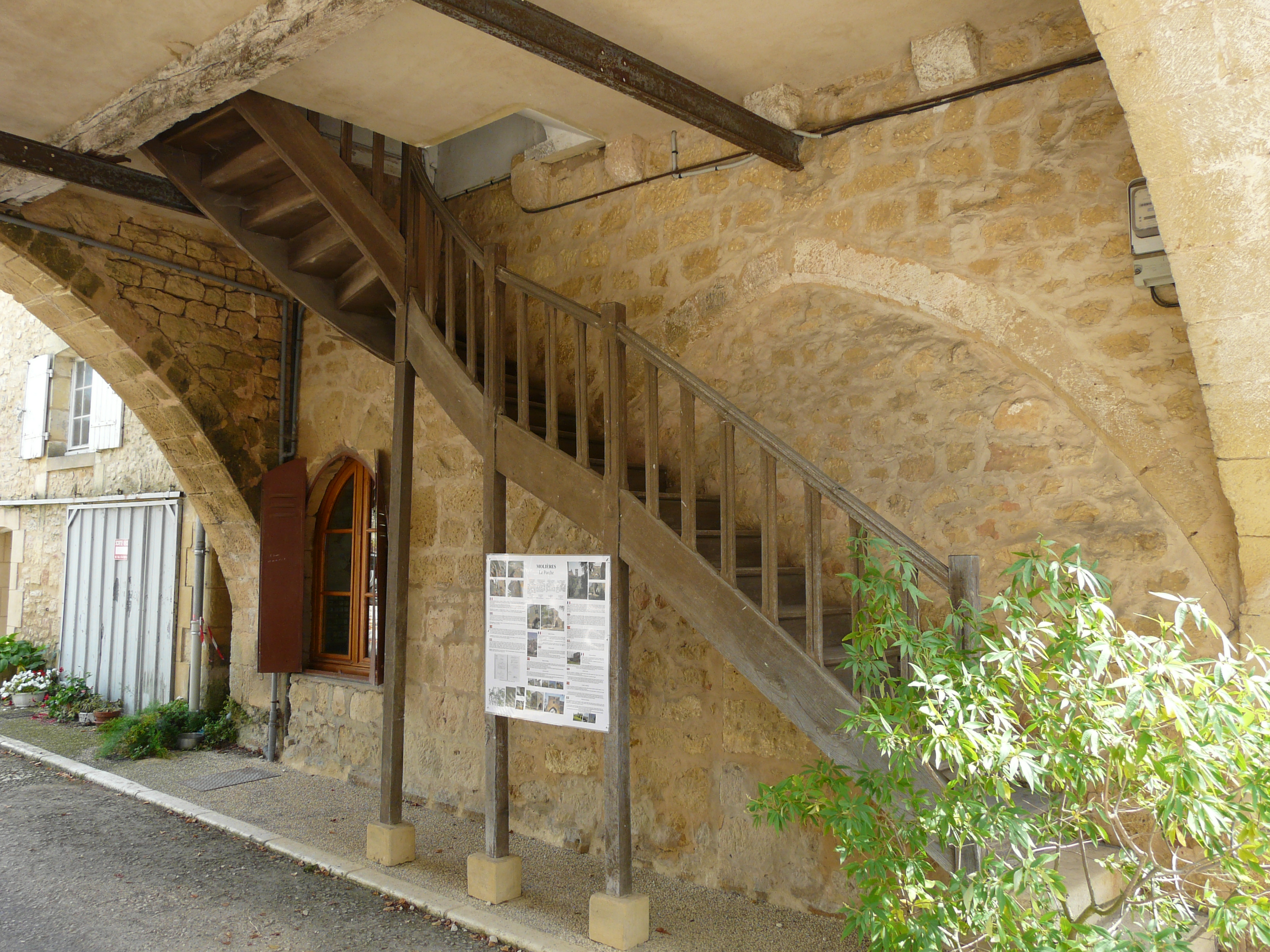
Wooden staircase in Molières, France

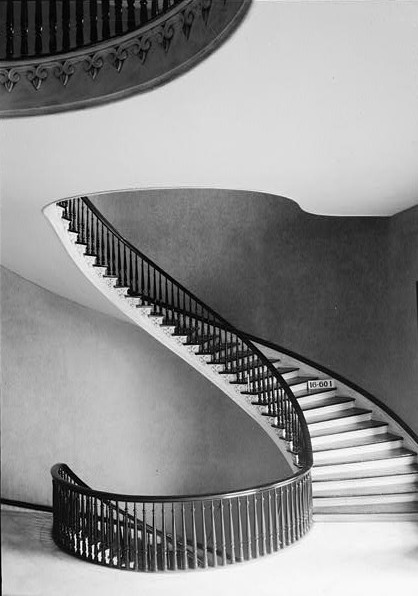
Helical stairway in the Alabama State Capitol

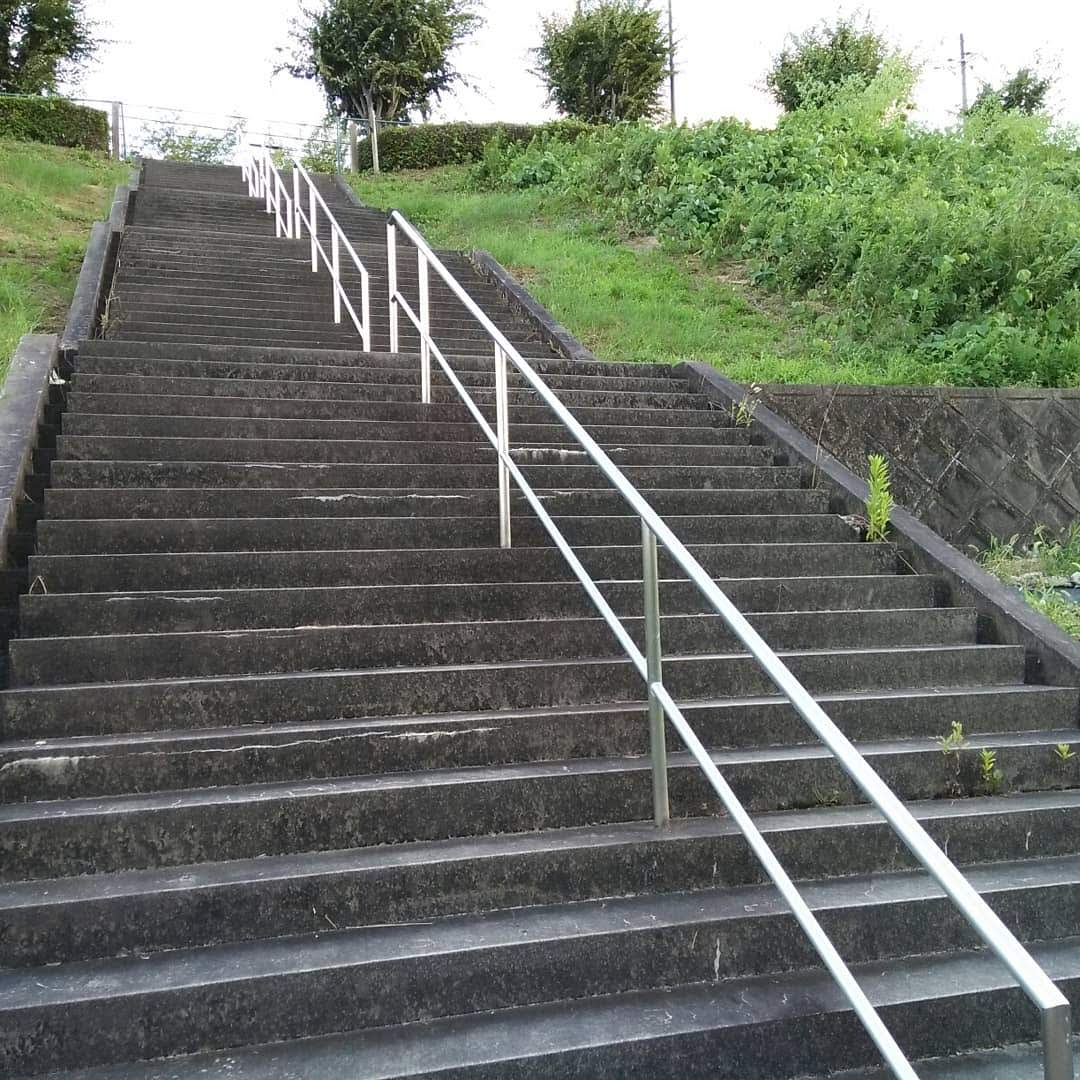
Long cascade of straight stairs in Ikoma, Japan

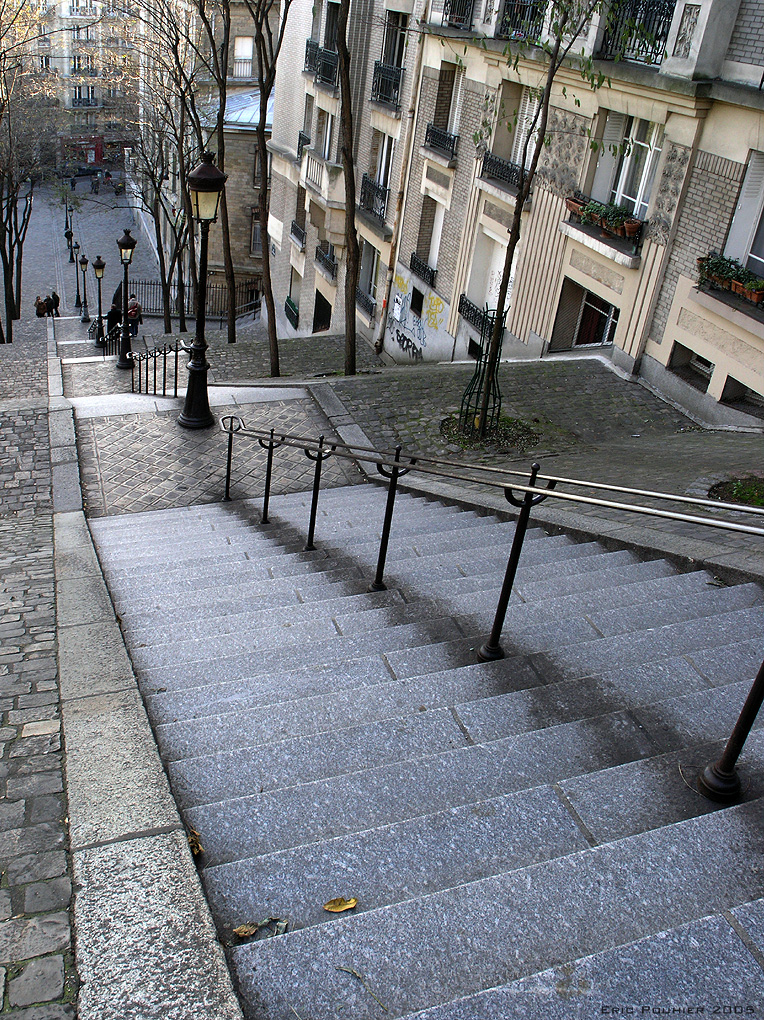
Rue Foyatier in Montmartre, Paris

Stair Alley in Lisbon

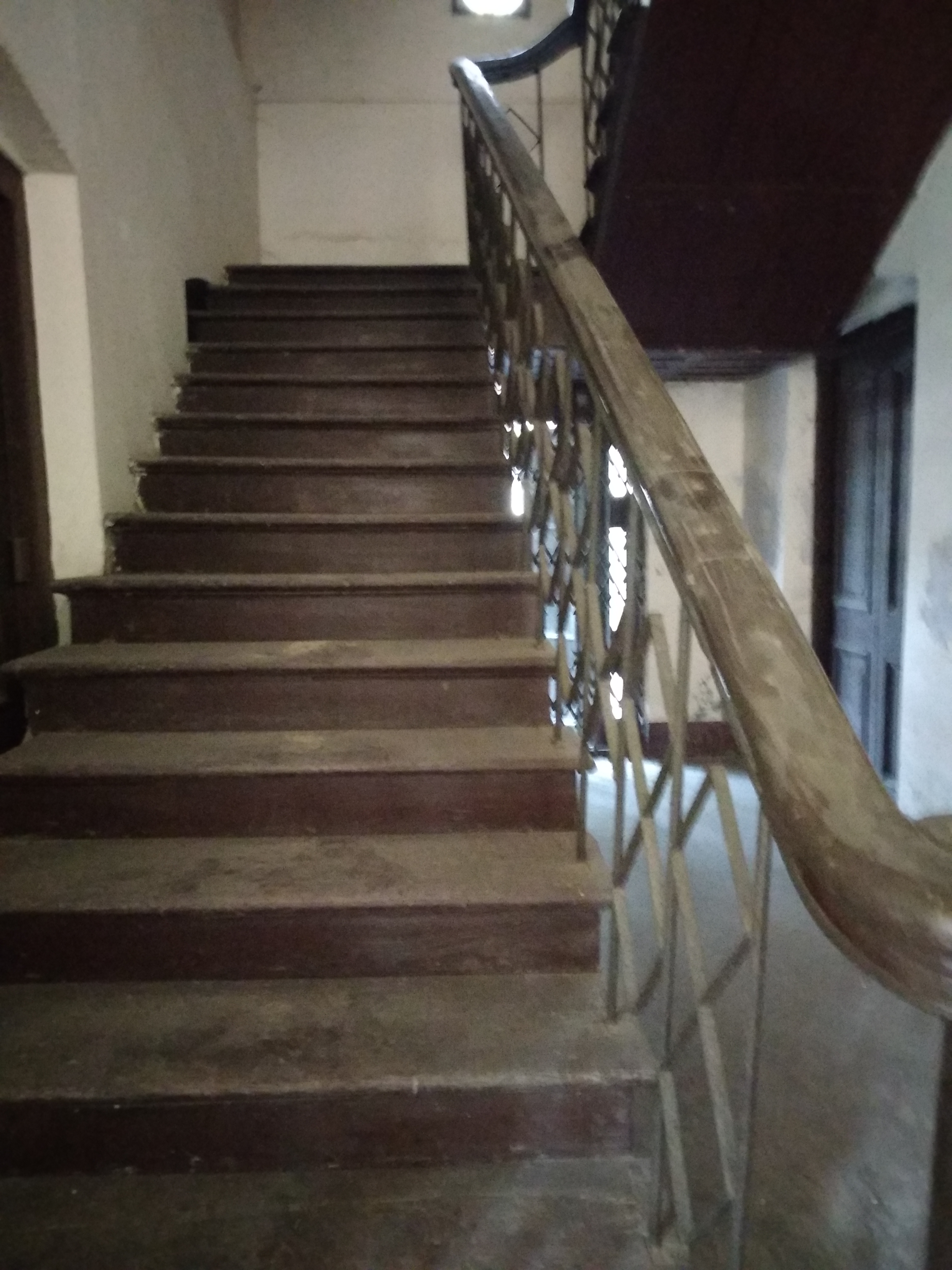
200-year-old wooden stairs in Tajhat Landlord's Palace

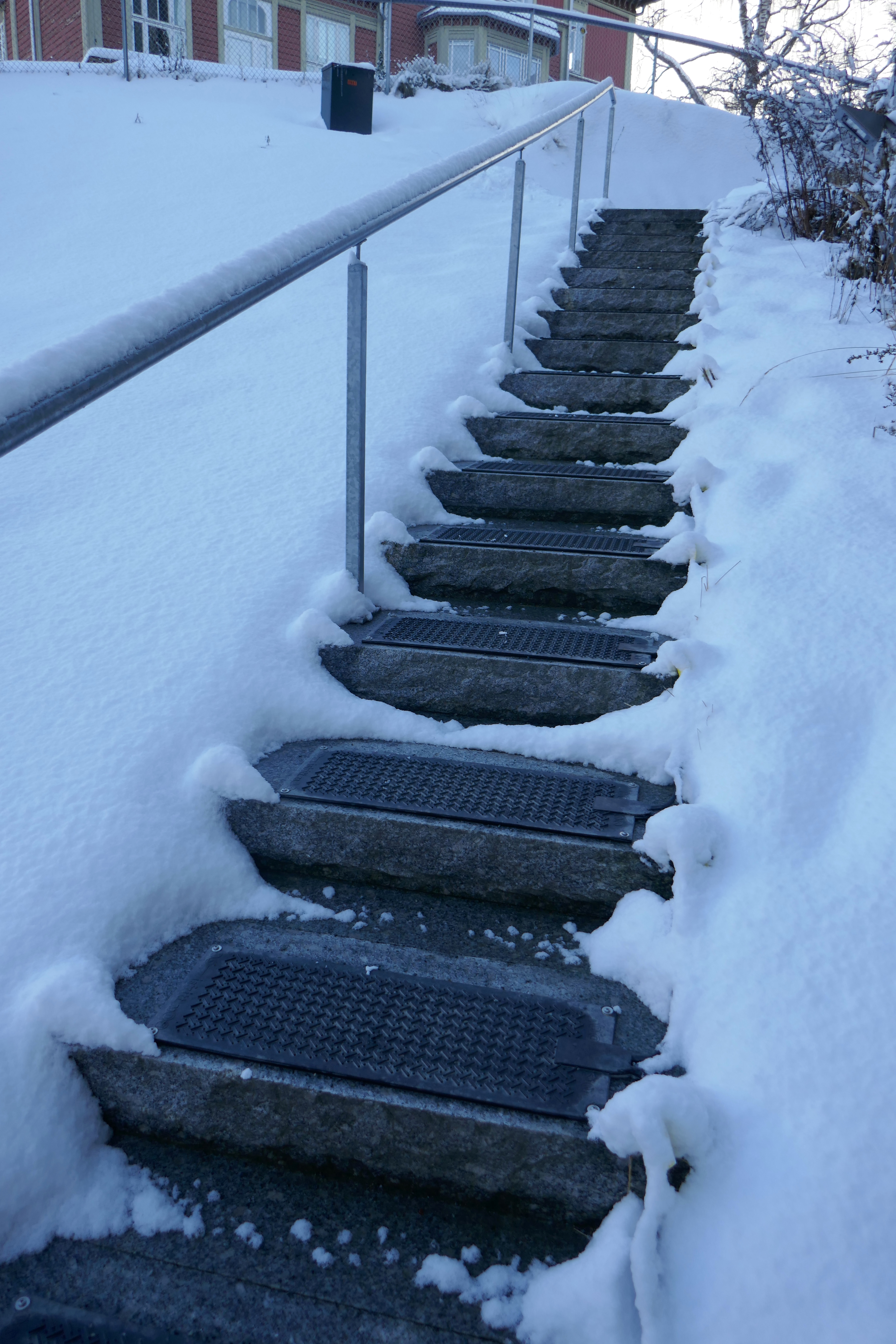
Heated stairs in Trondheim, Norway

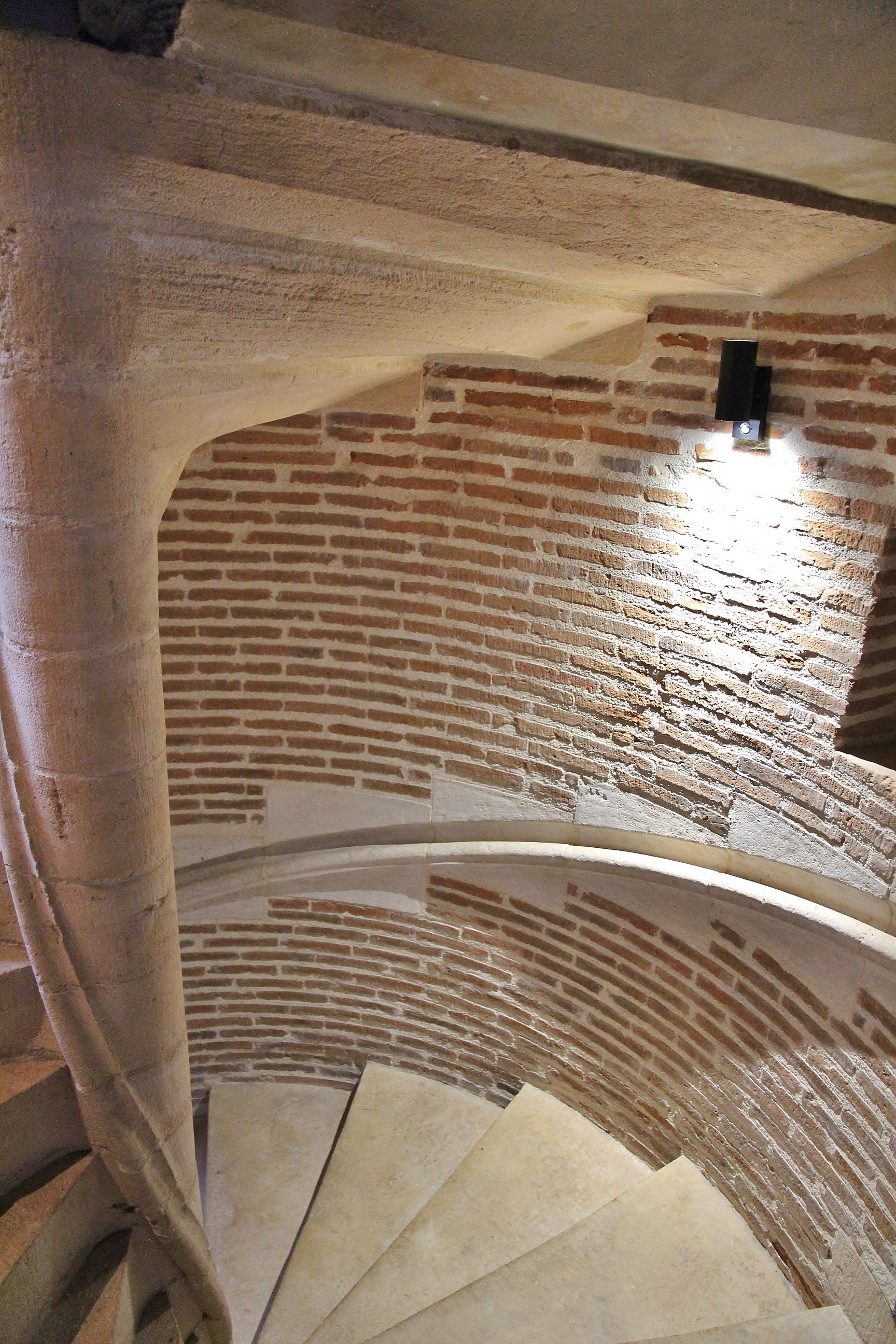
Typical medieval spiral staircase in Toulouse, France

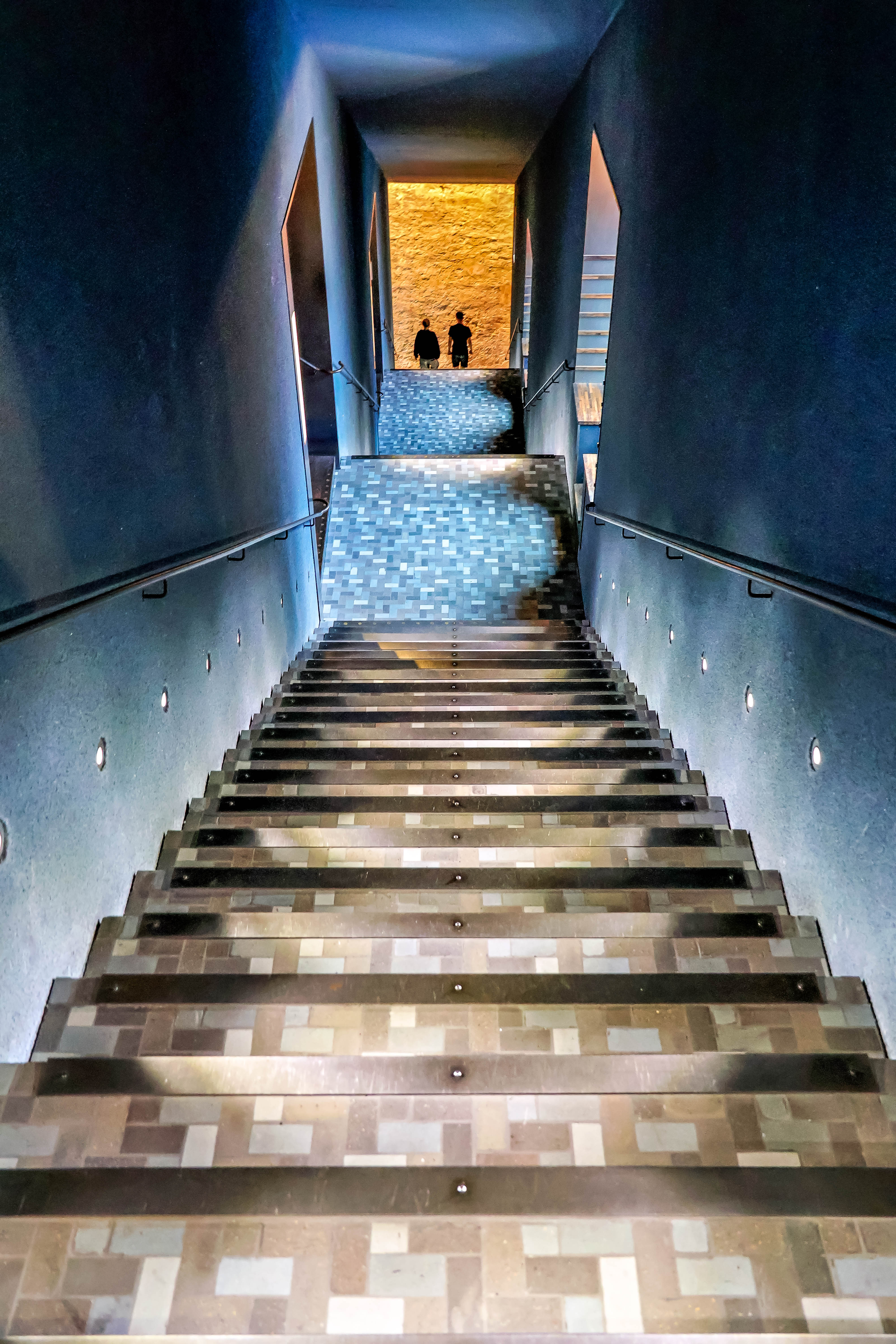
straight-flight staircase ("staircase to heaven" (Museum of German Romanticism)

== See also ==
- Alley
- Cable railings
- Combination stair
- Equestrian staircase
- Fire escape
- Fish ladder
- Inclined plane
- Mule ramp
- Penrose stairs
- Rocky Steps
- Smokeproof enclosure
- Stair climbing
- Staircase tower
- Steel square (for use in stair framing)
- Public stairways in Cincinnati
- Public stairways in Pittsburgh
- Stoop (architecture)
- Watermen's stairs
