= Dog (engineering) =

Tool in engineering

In engineering, a dog is a tool or part of a tool, such as a pawl, that prevents or imparts movement through physical engagement. It may hold another object in place by blocking it, clamping it, or otherwise obstructing its movement. Or it may couple various parts together so that they move in unison – the primary example of this being a flexible drive to mate two shafts in order to transmit torque. Some devices use dog clutches to lock together two spinning components. In a manual transmission, the dog clutches, or "dogs" lock the selected gear to the shaft it rotates on. Unless the dog is engaged, the gear will simply freewheel on the shaft.

This word usage is a metaphor derived from the idea of a dog (animal) biting and holding on, the "dog" name derived from the basic idea of how a dog jaw locks on, by the movement of the jaw, or by the presence of many teeth. In engineering the "dog" device has some special engineering work when making it – it is not a simple part to make as it is not a simple bar or pipe, and the metal used in its construction is likely to be special rather than regular steel.

There is potential for confusion as "dog tensioners" are levers that are named due to the shape of the lever appearing as a dog leg, as the lever is in a pantograph arrangement, or "dog trailers", which are named due to the use of multiple trailers for transporting animal cages.

== Subtypes and examples of applications ==
=== Chainsaw dog (felling dogs) ===
Although not seen on all chainsaws, when present chainsaw dogs or felling dogs are mounted where the bar meets the power head. They are usually made with 3 to 4 teeth, largest at the bottom, and are mounted on both sides of the bar. Felling dogs provide stability and serve as a sort of fulcrum for swinging the bar through the item being cut.

=== Shutter dog ===
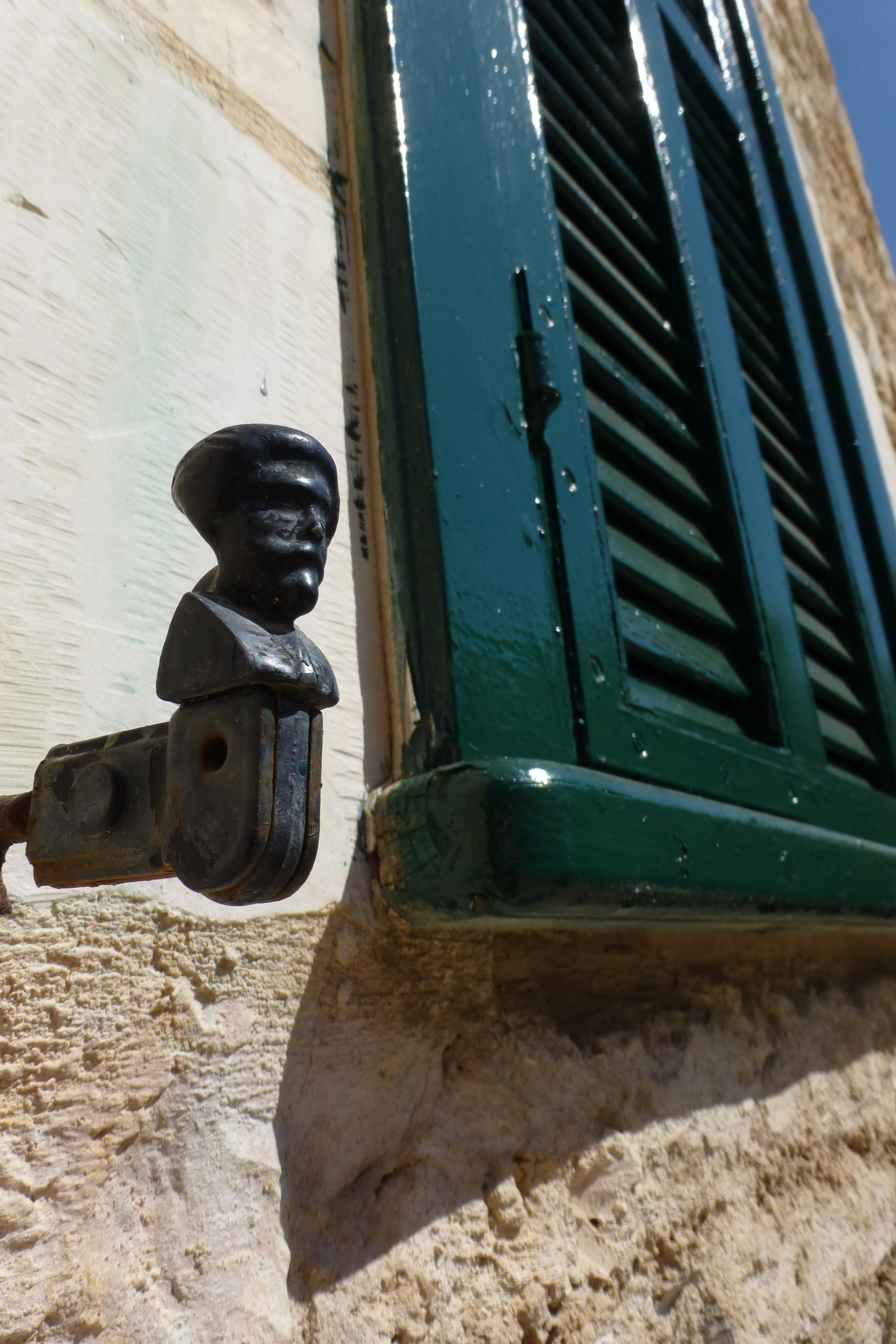
Shutter dog

Functional exterior window shutters (which can be swung shut whenever storms approach in order to protect the window glass from impact by wind-blown debris) are held open during pleasant weather by wrought-iron or cast-iron dogs, which are called shutter dogs.

=== Bench dog ===
A bench dog is an accessory used on a woodworking workbench to allow clamping of wooden items whilst being worked.

=== Ladder dog ===
Ladder dogs secure the sections of an extension ladder at a given height by engaging on its rungs, and are secured in place by spring-loaded pawls.

=== Door dog ===
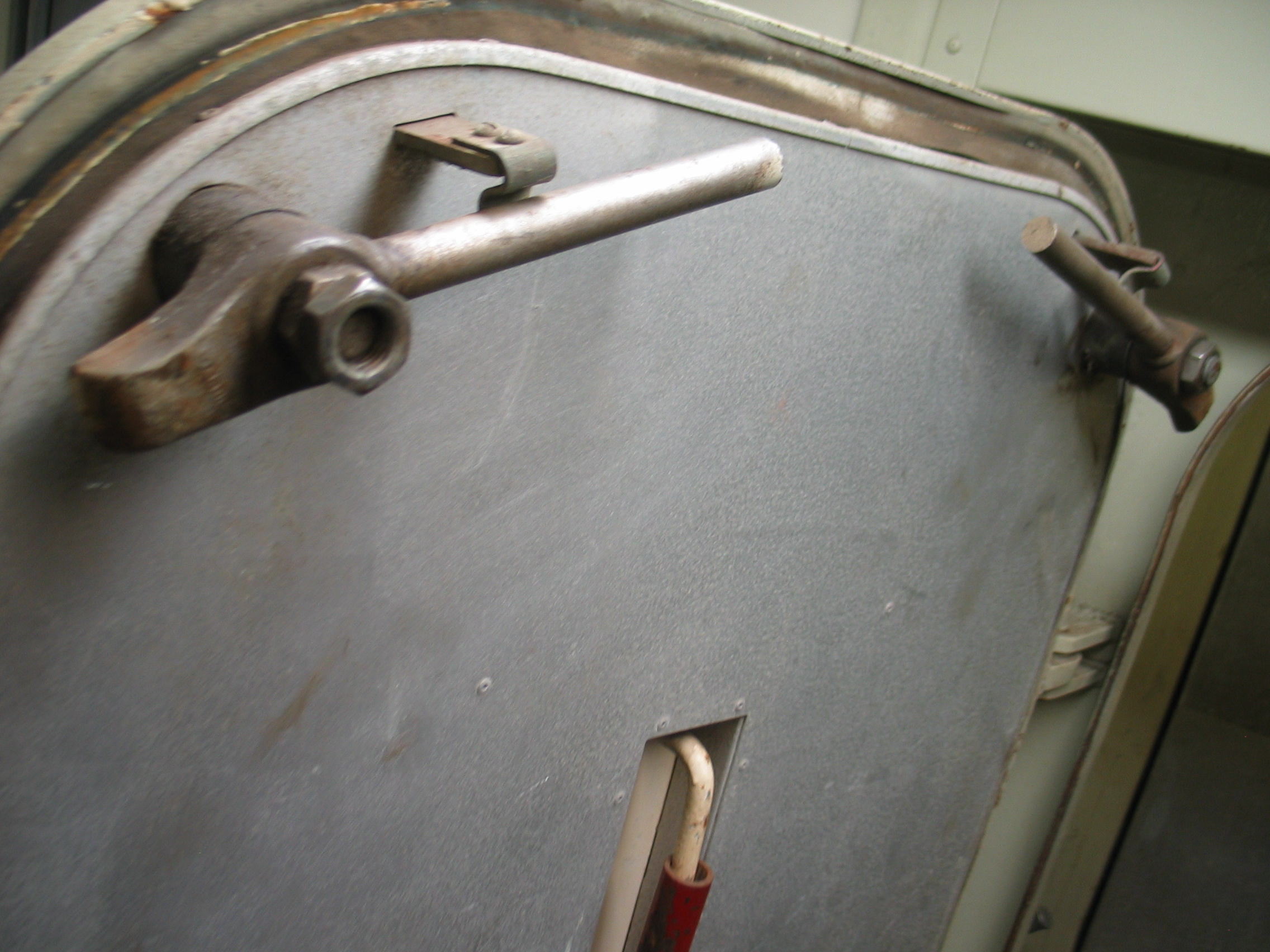
Hatch dogs around a door on the R/V Knorr

The watertight doors that allow passage through bulkheads between compartments inside a ship can be closed during emergencies to seal off one compartment from another, thus isolating flooding, smoke and heat from adjoining compartments. The objects that are wedged against the door to hold it closed are dogs. To dog the doors means to close the doors and secure them in the closed positions. Similarly, hatches are the horizontal openings between decks, and are secured with hatch dogs.

=== Firedog ===
A firedog, fire dog, or dog iron is a form of andiron used in a pair to secure wood for a fire or skewers for cooking over one.

=== Clutch dog ===
Clutch dogs are the individual lugs within a mechanism called the dog clutch, which comprises a pair of unconnected discs aligned axially, each with a radial arrangement of lugs which oppose one another and which interlock when the plates are in contact. Examples of dog clutches can be found in many vintage automobiles and are implemented in some modern automatic transmissions. The dog clutch contrasts with the friction clutch, the most basic form of which comprises a smooth disc and pressure plate: when pressed together they lock up simply through friction, which permits some degree of slip as the mating pressure is modulated and thus permits some difference in the rotational speeds of the discs. A dog clutch, however, is a binary system, thus requiring that the rotating speeds of the two discs be matched prior to mating to avoid damage by jerk within the system - this can be achieved automatically, such as by implementing a synchromesh mechanism, or manually, as in a crash gearbox.

=== Lathe dog ===
A lathe dog (or "lathe carrier") is a form of clutch dog used to secure a workpiece to a metal lathe.

=== Feed dog ===
The feed dogs of a sewing machine feed the fabric in a linear stepping motion past the needle.

=== Log dog or timber dog ===
In carpentry log dogs were used to repair timber frame joints. In hewing (shaping with an axe) timbers or sawing with some types of water powered sawmills log dogs are used to hold the timber in place.

=== Drive dog or reel dog ===
In film projection, reel arms and film rewinds employ drive pins adjacent to the spindle shaft, which are used to drive the reel as the spindle rotates. These are referred to as drive dogs or reel dogs.

== Gallery ==
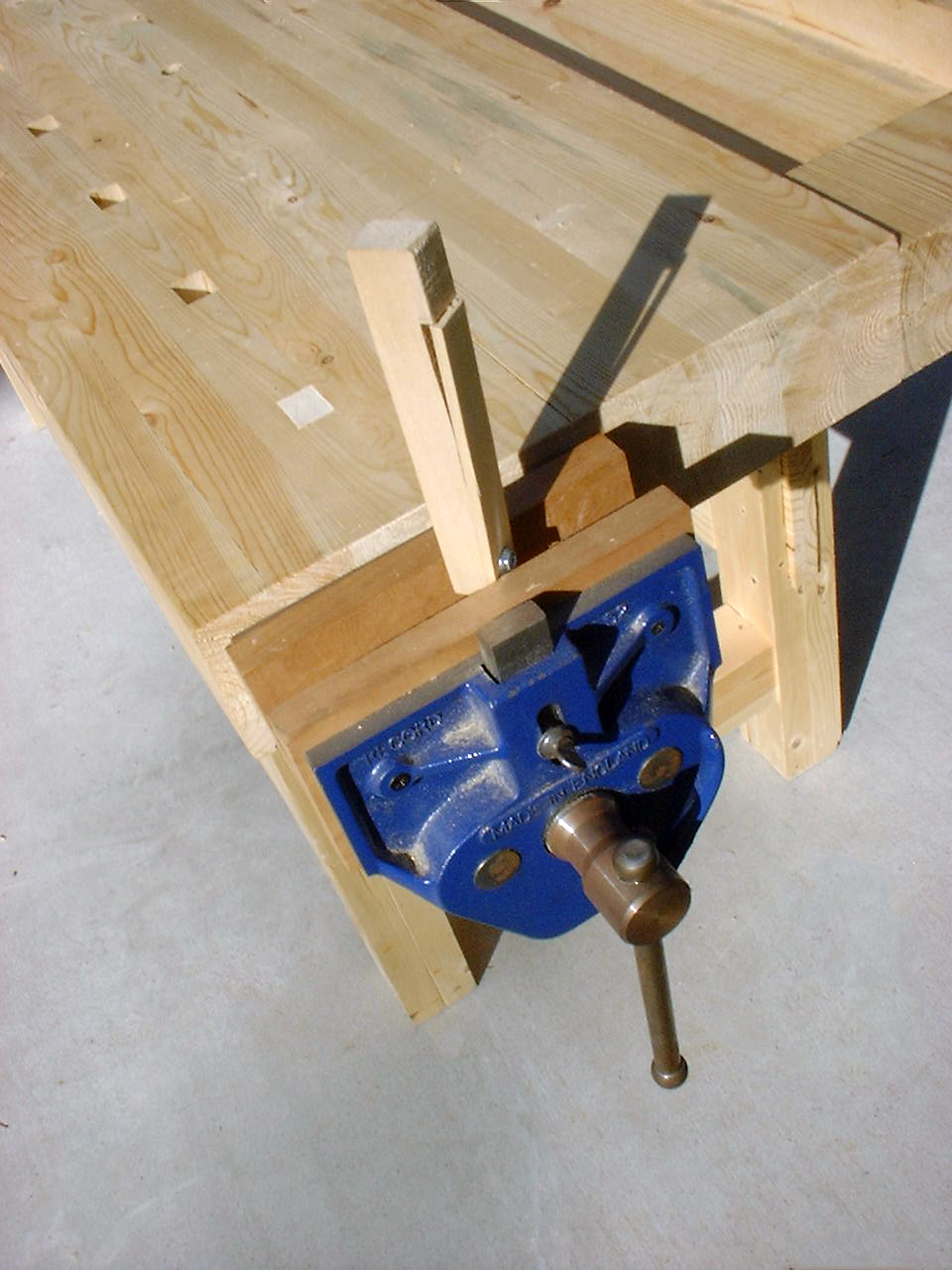
A bench vise with its dog extended, holding (without using the dog) a wooden bench dog being worked

A ladder dog

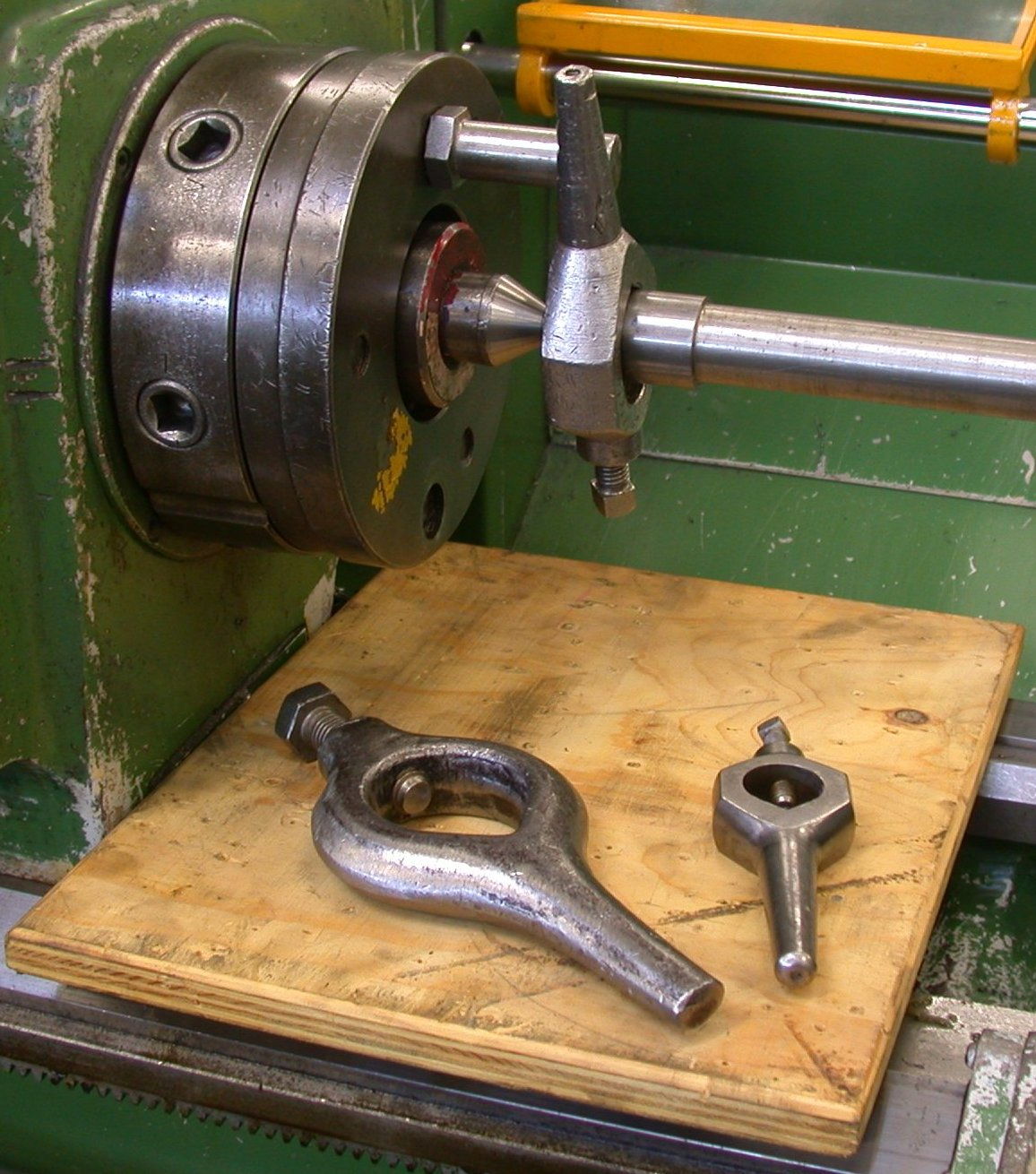
Straight-leg lathe dogs (carriers)

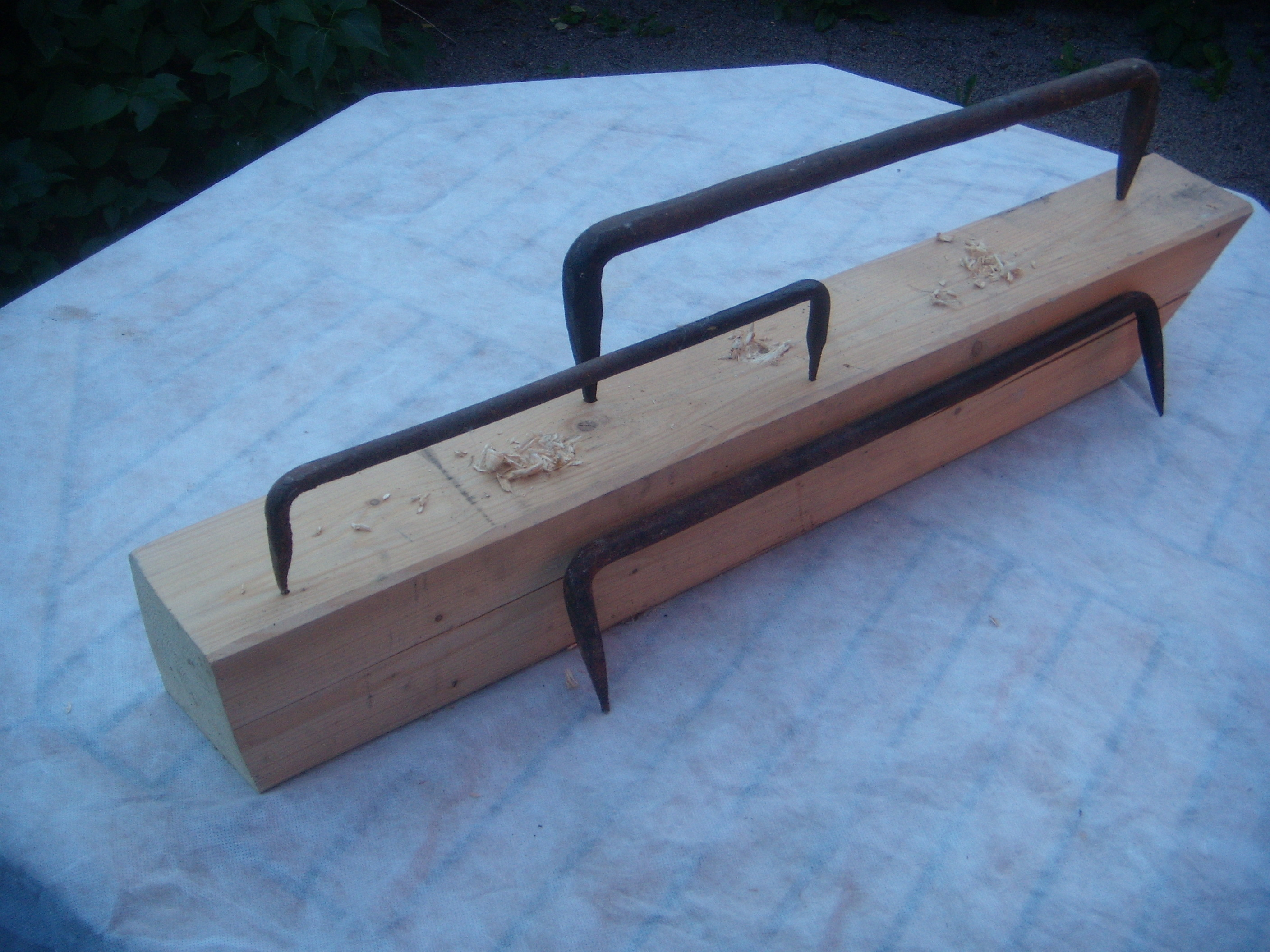
Log dogs are used to hold timbers in place while hewing or as a repair to timber frame joints.
