= Workbench (woodworking) =

Type of workbench used in woodworking

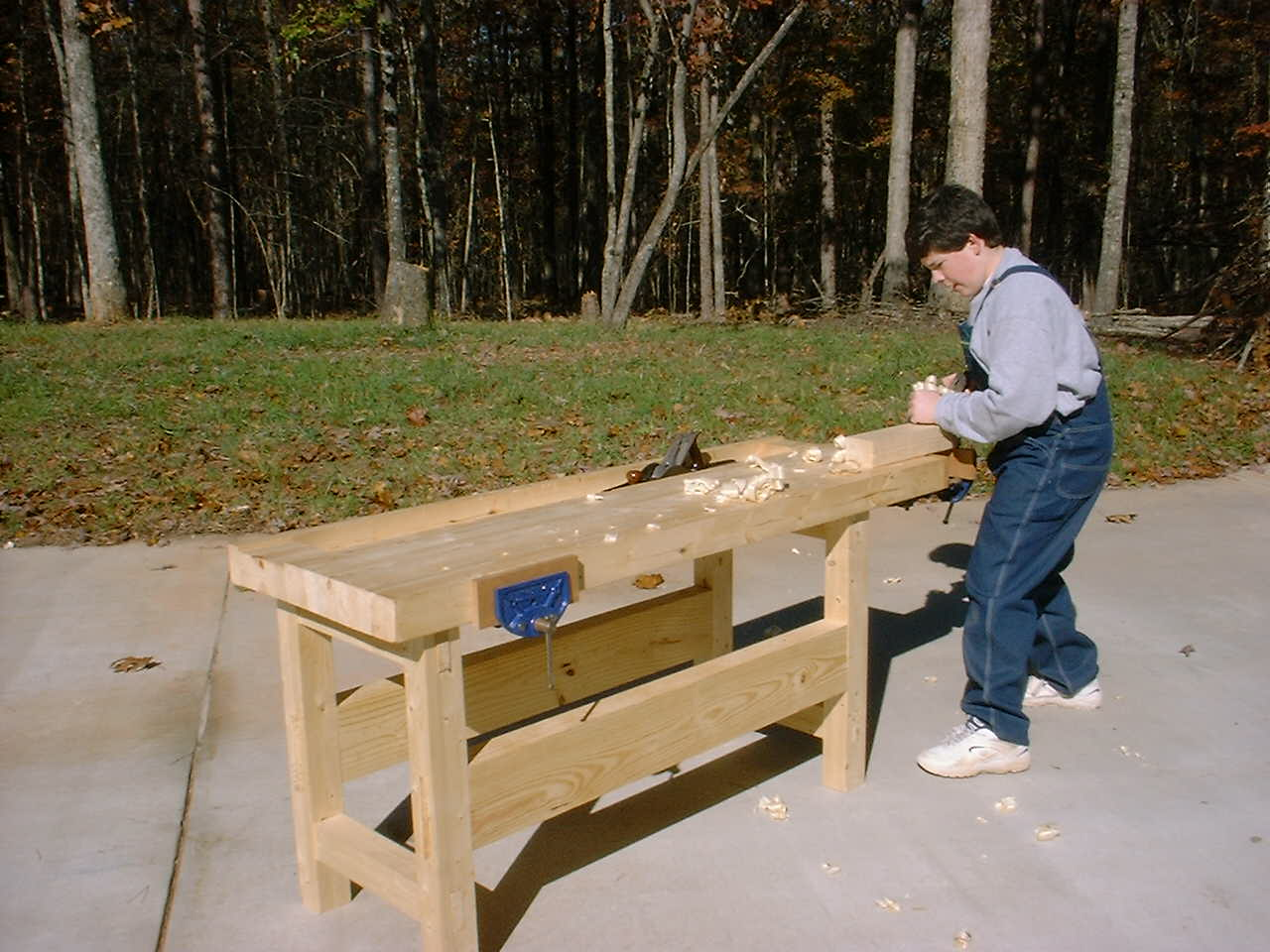
A basic bench with both front (left) and tail (right) vises

A workbench is a specialized workbench table used by woodworkers. Features include a flat, solid work surface and one or more means of holding the material being worked on.

== Styles ==
There are many styles of woodworking bench. Styles of workbenches include Nicholson (sometimes referred to as the English workbench), Moravian, Scandinavian (or European) and Roubo (or French).

Historically, the style choice was dependent on the woodworker's training or dictated by the region. Currently, with woodworking being so popular as a hobby, workbench choice is often dependent on the type of work being done or the preferred method of working. All styles aim to keep the workpieces immobile while work is being performed. This is accomplished by making them heavy (Scandinavian and Roubo) or in their geometry (Nicholson and Moravian).

== Holding the work ==
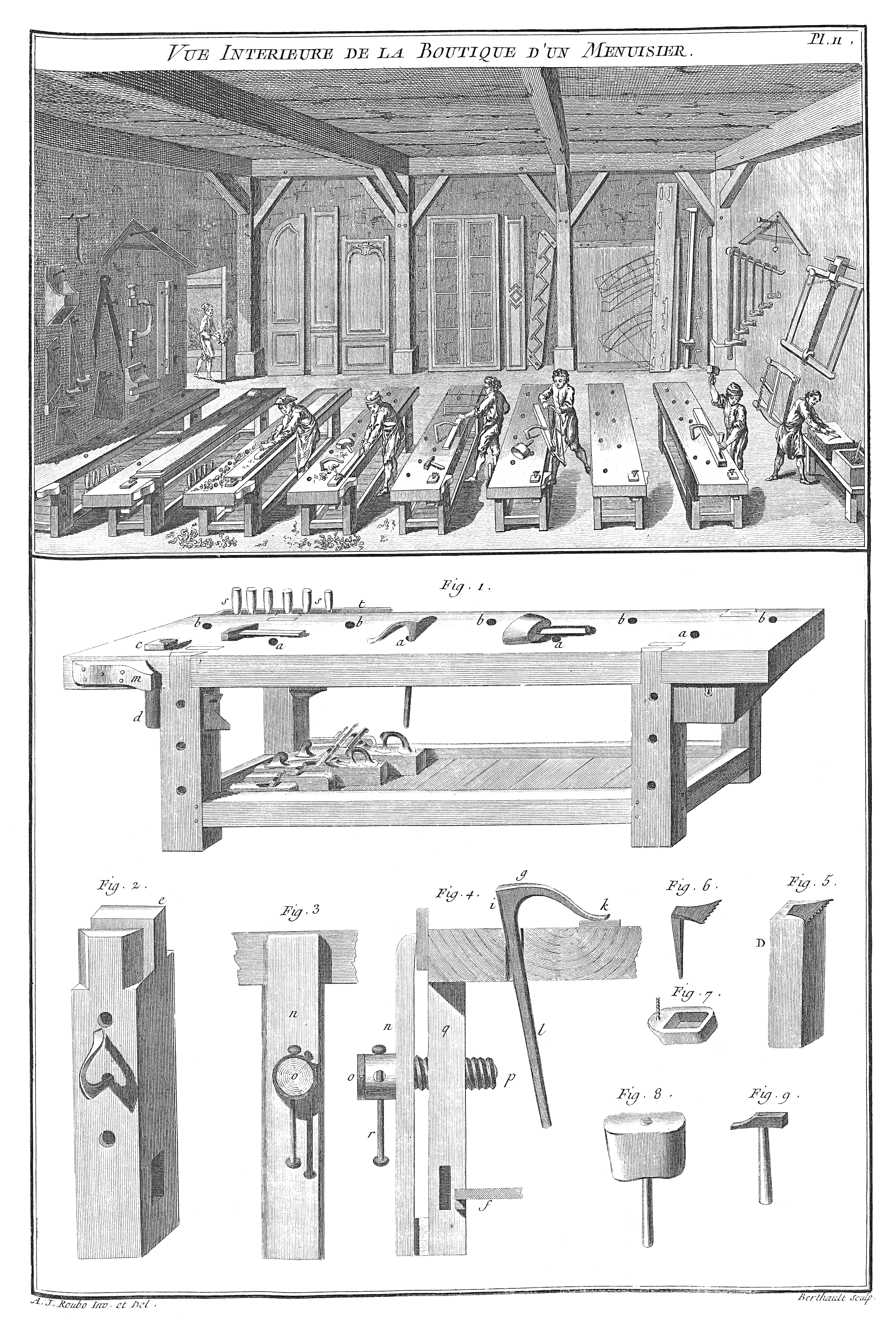
Original Roubo workbench plans, 1769

=== Vise ===
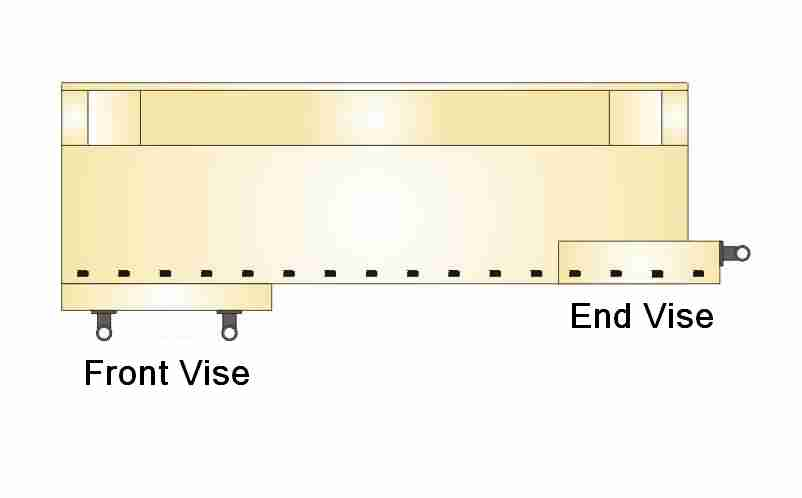
Overhead view of one arrangement of woodworking vise positions

A woodworking vise holds work in its jaws, or compressed against a bench dog or holdfast. Holes to receive these stops or clamps are typically drilled in line with a vise in 3-4" intervals, with others added to the benchtop to serve various purposes.

There are two main locations for a vise (vice in UK English sp.) or vises on a workbench: on the front, a workbench's long face, known as a "front" ("face", or "shoulder") vise, and on the end, known as a “tail" vise. Either or both may be mounted on the right side of their face to allow a workpiece extending from them to be more easily worked by a right-handed person, though a common arrangement is with the front vise mounted on the left of a long side and the tail on the right side of the diagonally opposite end.

=== Bench dog ===
Probably the oldest and most basic method of holding the work is a bench dog, which in its simplest form is simply a peg or small piece of wood or metal wedged into a hole in the bench top that stands just above the surface, allowing a workpiece to be clamped between it and an adjustable dog on a face vise.

=== Holdfast ===
Another ancient method of holding the work is the holdfast, a form of temporary clamp used to hold a workpiece firmly to the top or side of a workbench.

A form of bench dog, a traditional holdfast has either a curved or flat top. Its shank is slid loosely into a “dog” hole in the bench until the tip of its hook touches the work. It is set by hitting its top with a mallet or hammer, which causes the shaft to wedge tightly against the sides of the hole. A tap of its back side near the top releases it.

=== Hardpoints ===
In addition to dog holes some workbenches have hardpoints, which are metal threads embedded in the wood. These allow convenient repeated assembly and disassembly of work jigs, and can be useful in other tasks.

== Construction materials ==
Most workbenches are made from solid wood; the most expensive and desirable are made of solid hardwood, with tops laminated lengthwise in edge-grain butcher block fashion. Benches may also be made from plywood and Masonite or hardboard, and bases of treated pine and even steel.

There are trade offs with the choice of construction material. Solid wood has many advantages including strength, workability, appearance. A plywood or hardboard bench top has the advantages of being stable, relatively inexpensive. The practical drawbacks of a plywood or composite bench top are that they don't hold their corners and edges well, and they can't be resurfaced with a plane—something that is needed from time to time.

Maple is the traditional wood. Others used include beech and oak. A potential source for bench top material is old bowling alley lanes. These are usually made from thick, high-quality laminated maple.

== Size ==
The optimum size of a bench depends on the work to be done, space considerations, and budget. In general, bigger is better. An additional disadvantage of a smaller bench is that it is usually too light to resist heavy work without skidding around.
