= Bench dog =

Accessory used on a woodworking workbench to secure a workpiece

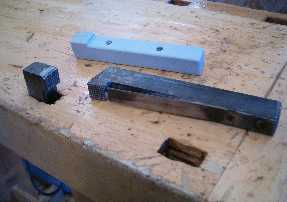
Two metal and one plastic bench dog

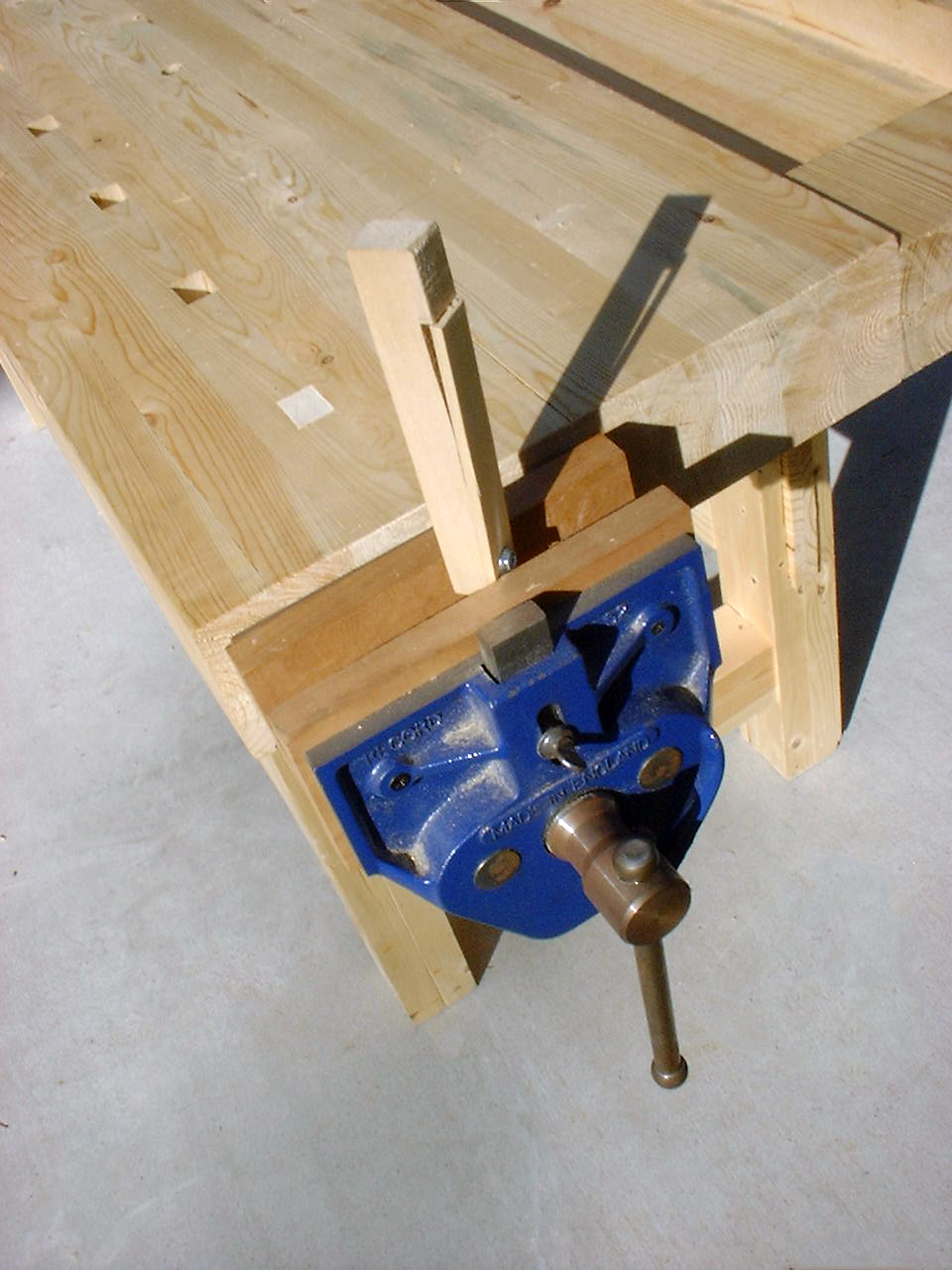
A woodworker's tail vise with its dog extended, holding (without using the dog) a wooden bench dog being worked

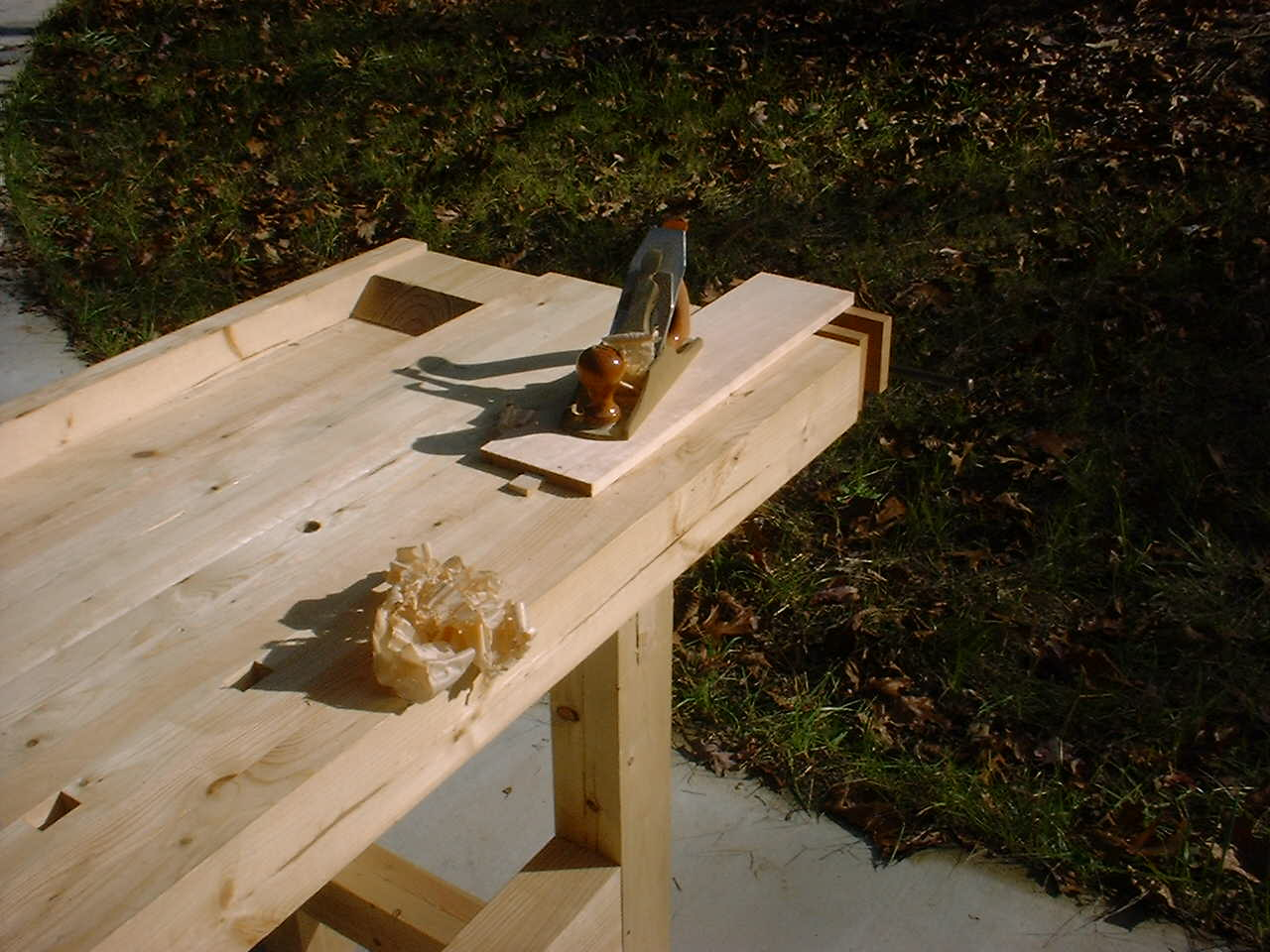
A bench dog in use. Notice that the dog can be lowered below the edge of the item being worked to keep clear of an action such as planing

A bench dog is a removable stop used in a woodworking workbench to hold a piece of wood. It is characteristically used in concert with an adjustable dog on a bench vise, allowing an item compressed between the two to be held fast on each end, and if offset in both directions.

A dog in general is something which holds. Technically, a simple peg installed in a dog hole in the top of a bench is a basic form of bench dog, though those dogs which clamp an item fast to the bench rather than merely sandwich it between itself and a dog on a vise, known as holdfasts, are most common.

Dog holes are arranged in a line perpendicular to the jaws of a vise, typically in intervals of four to six inches. Some workbenches have a second row parallel to the vise jaws, to allow broad or long items to be held fast in two directions, as well as to the benchtop itself when using one or more holdfasts.

Bench dogs may be square or round. Round dog holes are easier to make but do not secure a dog as securely as square. Some woodworkers use round dogs which have been flattened on their rear to bear in square holes.

== See also ==
- Dog (engineering)
- Vise (tool)
- Holdfast
