= Pawl =

Mechanical device to restrict movement

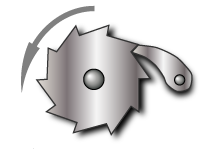
A ratchet and pawl mechanism

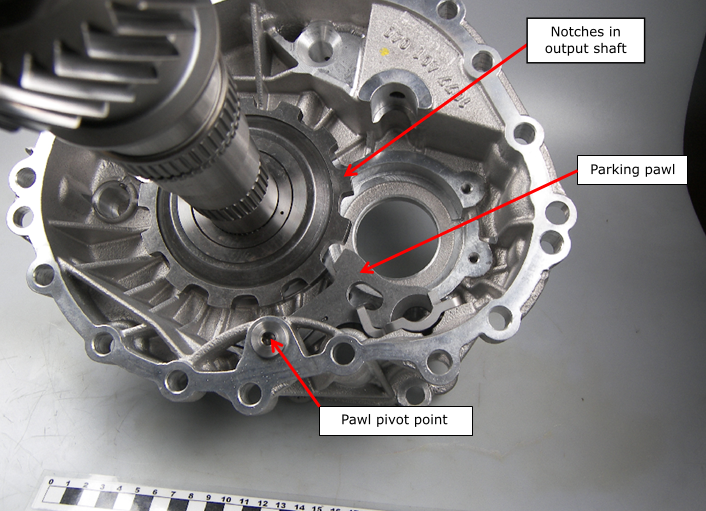
A parking pawl in an automatic transmission

A pawl is a movable lever that engages a fixed component to either prevent movement in one direction or restrain it altogether. As such, it is a type of latch and can also be considered a type of dog. It typically consists of a spring-loaded lever that engages a mating component at a steep enough angle to restrain it. Pawls are often tapered, being widened at their pivot for anchoring and narrow at their tip.

== Applications ==
Anchor windlass
A pawl is used in an anchor windlass to prevent a free-spooling chain by grabbing and snubbing an individual link. Similar mechanisms include a Devil's claw, or a claw and dog.
Ratchet
A pawl is used in combination with a ratchet gear in socket wrenches, bicycle freehubs, winches, ratchet reels for diving, fishing, and many other applications.
Ladder
Dogs (in the form of pawls) are used on extension ladders to temporarily anchor their sections to one-another.
Table saw
Pawls are used on table saws to prevent a workpiece being sawn from kicking back.
Transmission
A parking pawl is a device in an automobile automatic transmission which prevents it from moving when the vehicle is parked .
Revolver
The hand (pawl) indexes the cylinder.
