= Holdfast (tool) =

Woodworking tool for securing a work-piece to a bench

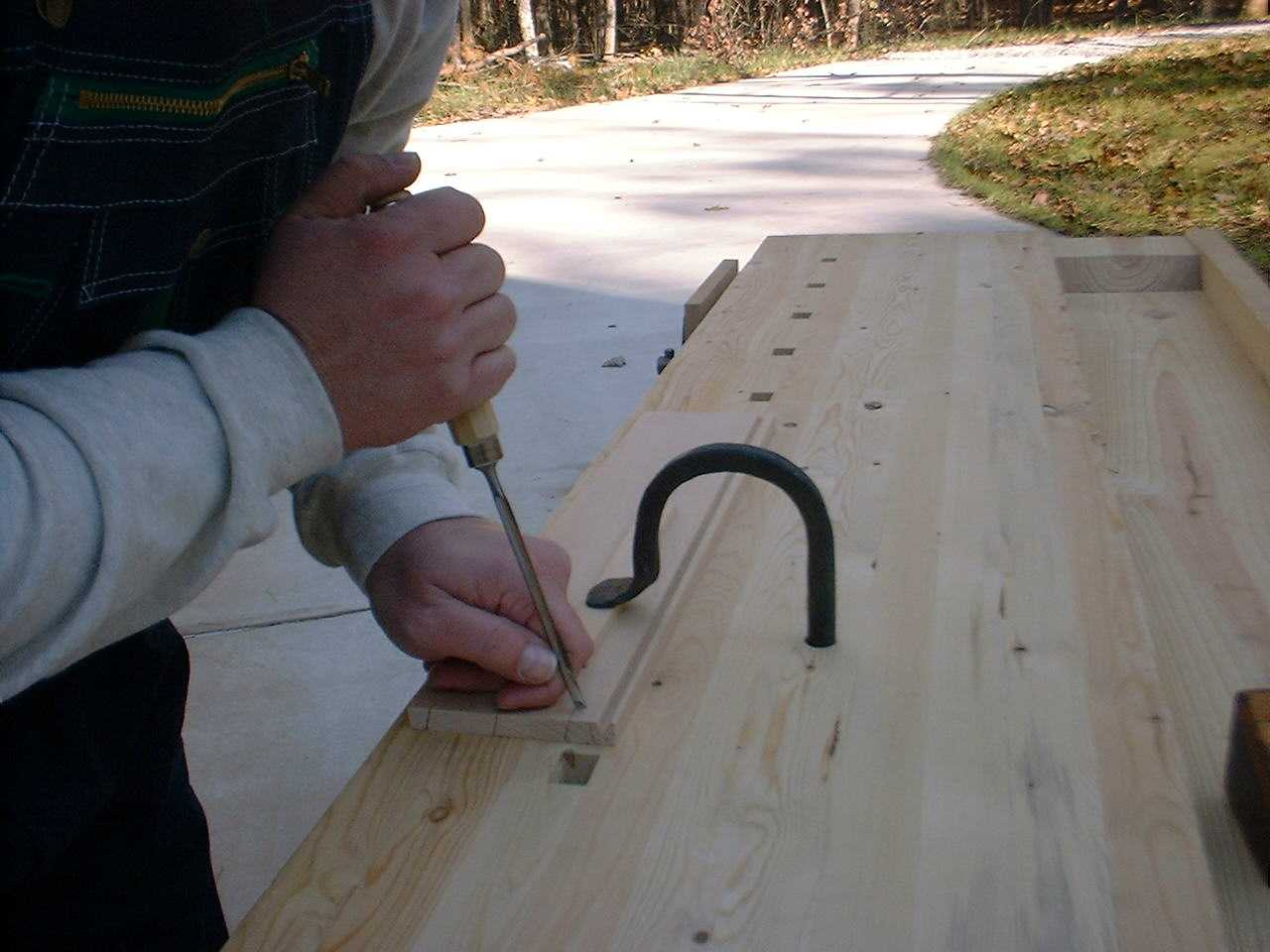
- A carpenter using a holdfast
- Other names: Hold fast, hold-down
- Used with: Woodworking workbench or anvil

A holdfast or hold fast is a form of temporary clamp used to hold a workpiece firmly to the top or side of a wooden workbench or the top of an anvil.

A form of bench dog, a traditional holdfast has either a curved or flat top. Its shank is slid loosely into a “dog” hole in the bench or anvil until the tip of its hook touches the work. It is set by hitting its top with a mallet or hammer, which causes the shaft to wedge tightly against the sides of the hole. A tap of its back side near the top releases it.

Contemporary holdfasts are commonly designed to fit in 3/4 inch (19 mm) holes, somewhat narrower than had been traditional. Scrap pieces of wood or leather are often used between the holdfast and the workpiece to prevent marring it.

An adaptation of the holdfast is threaded, sometimes known as a “screwdown”, which is tightened rather than tapped into place.

== History ==
Based on a fresco discovered in the ruins of Herculaneum, holdfasts are known to have been in use since at least the 1st century AD. They are also described and illustrated in early European books on woodworking, such as Joseph Moxon's 1678 edition of Mechanick Exercises and André Jacob Roubo's 1774 L'Art du Menuisier. The term has been in use since at least the 16th Century. Use declined throughout the 20th century, but has seen a resurgence in recent years.

== Gallery ==
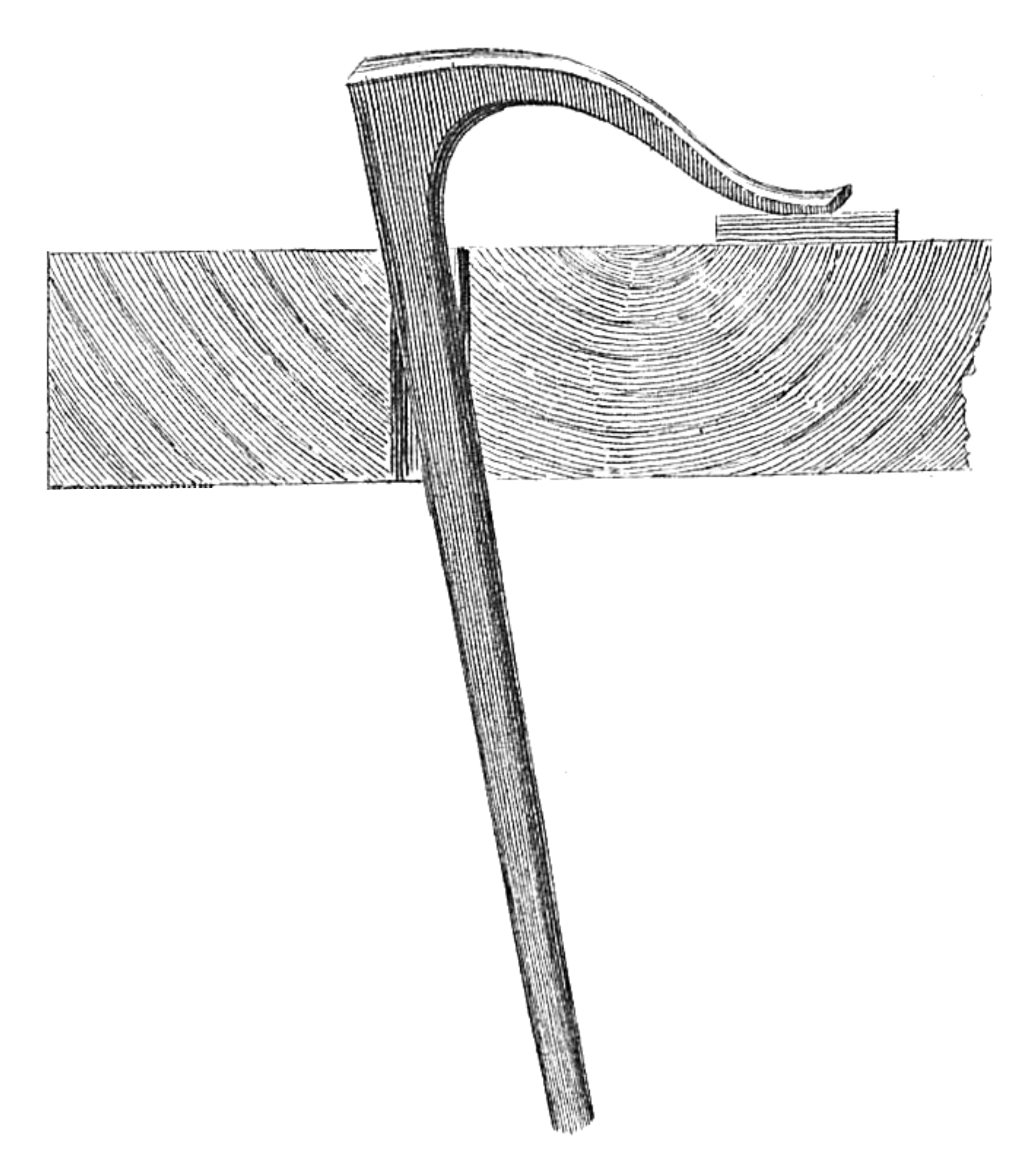
Illustration from L'Art du Menuisier (1769) demonstrating how the holdfast is secured in the workbench hole

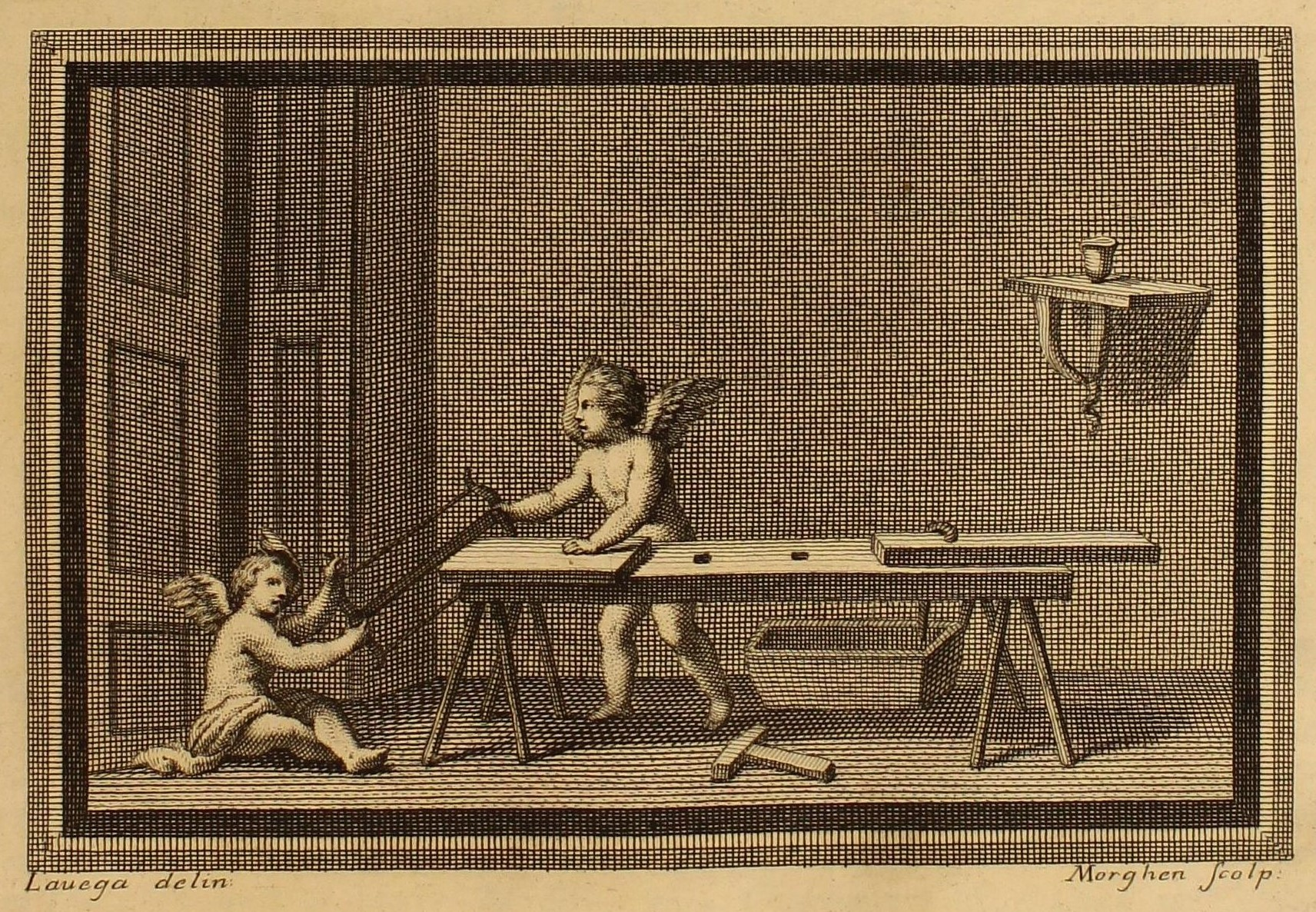
Roman workbench with a holdfast, based on a 1st Century AD fresco from the ruins of Herculaneum

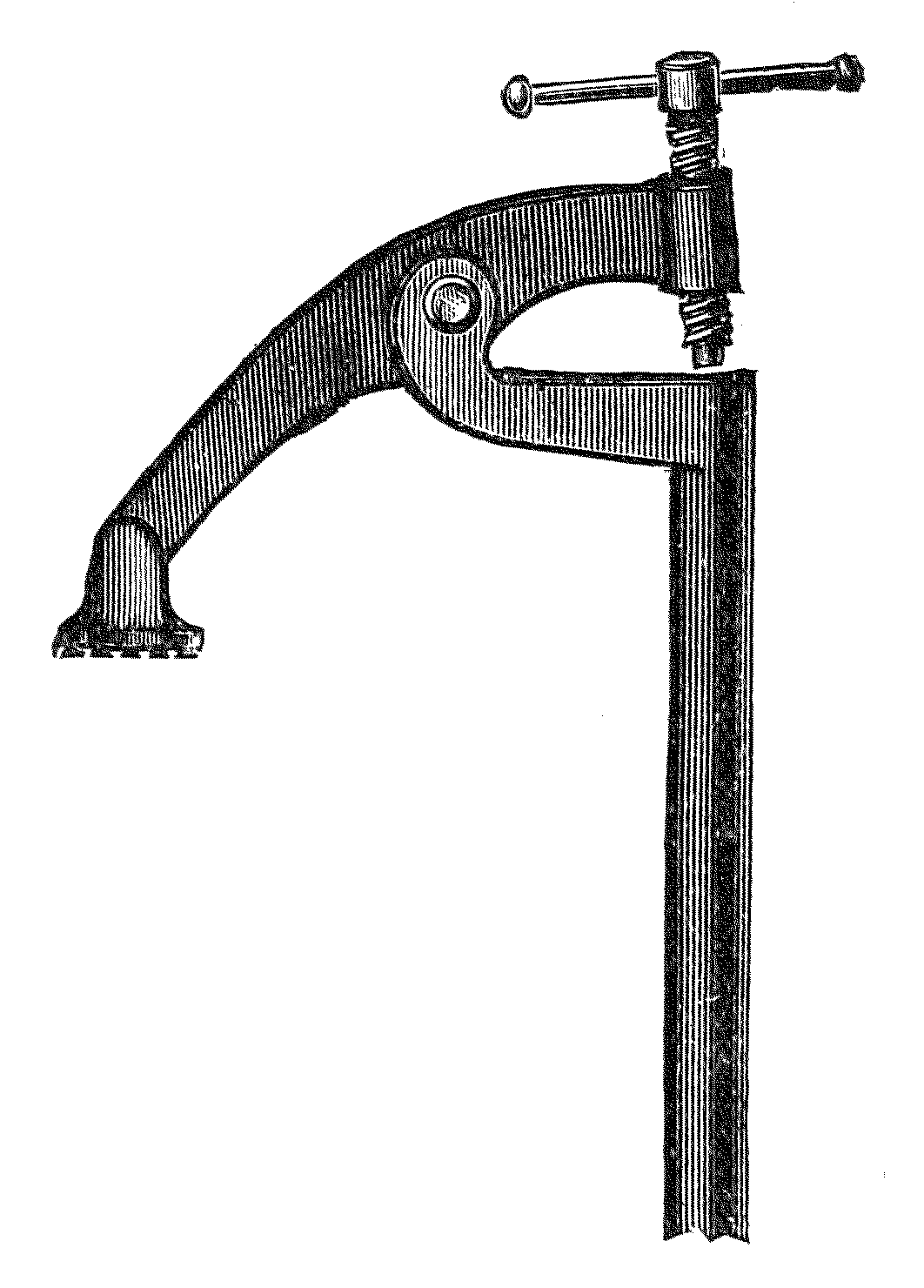
Illustration of a screwed holdfast from Cassell's Carpentry and Joinery (1907)

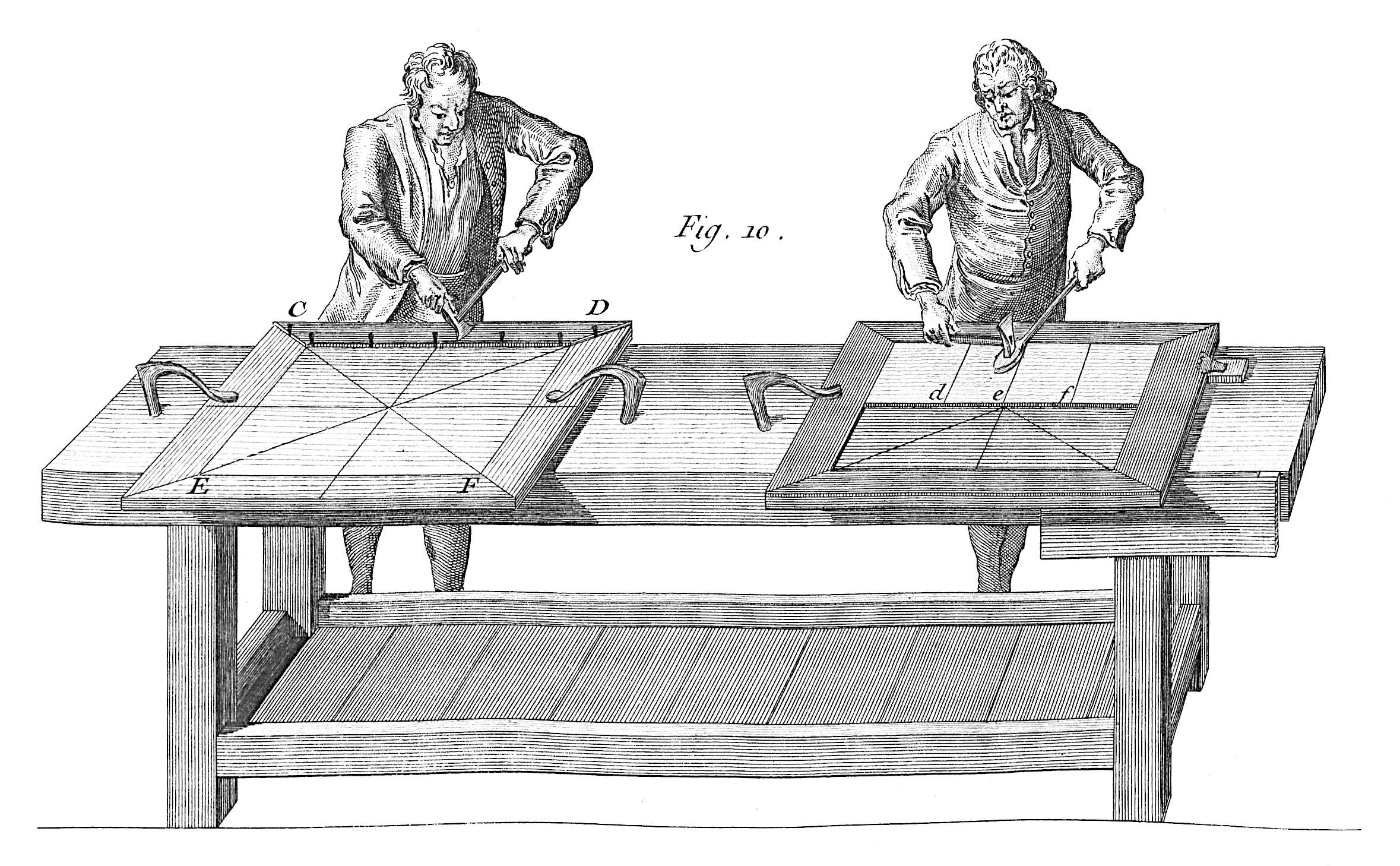
Illustration from L'Art du Menuisier (1769) showing a workbench with holdfasts in use

== See also ==
- Bench dog
- Clamp (tool)
