= André Jacob Roubo =

French carpenter, cabinetmaker and author

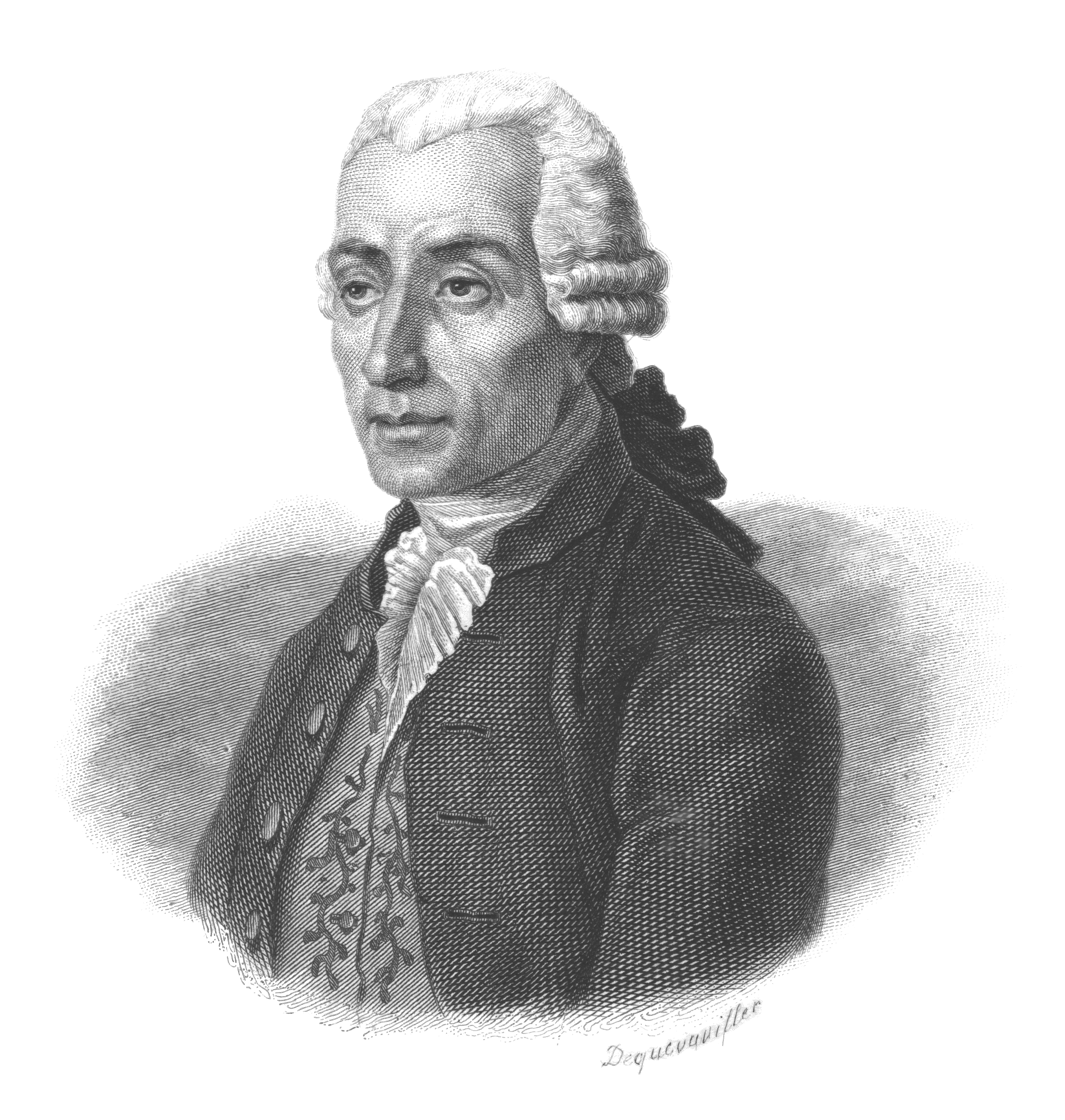
Portrait of Roubo from Portraits and History of Useful Men (1836)

André Jacob Roubo (1739–1791) was a French carpenter, cabinetmaker and author. Roubo was born and died in Paris, and was the son and grandson of master cabinetmakers. Roubo wrote several highly influential books on woodworking, an achievement which was especially notable given his relatively poor background and self-taught methods.

His career peaked in 1774 when he published his masterwork treatise on woodworking, titled L'Art du Menuisier. This long-standing work covered practically all methods and trades associated with woodworking. Another of Roubo's legacies still used today is a design for a workbench, which has proven to be popular amongst modern woodworkers.

A street in Paris, rue Roubo, was named after Roubo in 1850. It is located in the 11th Arrondissement, an area inhabited by furniture manufacturers.

== Personal life and career ==
André Jacob Roubo was born in Paris in 1739, the son and grandson of fellow woodworkers. His father was a joiner, and André became his apprentice in 1750 at the age of 11. Despite having a relatively poor upbringing, André was literate and taught himself various topics including mathematics and design. His dedication for learning attracted the attention of several professionals, including the architect Jean-François Blondel. Roubo became a pupil of Blondel who waived his tuition fees, and spent five years studying whilst also working for his father during the day. He received the title of Master in 1770 upon publication of the first part of L'Art du Menuisier. He designed and supervised the construction of the great domes of the halls Wheat and Cloth, and a monumental staircase to the hotel of the Marquis de Marbeuf.

In 1768, at the age of 29, Roubo started working on his treatise more intensively, having done practical woodwork for 18 years. This treatise was published in four volumes between 1769 and 1775. In 1777, he published the first part of a treatise of theater construction and theatrical machinery. The footnotes of these books show that Roubo had an interest in the social status of artisans. In 1789 most of his noble customers had left France; Roubo was nearly bankrupt and was forced to join the National Guard in 1790. Here he achieved the rank of Lieutenant before dying in 1791. He left a widow and four children who lived on his pension in Rue Saint-Jacques, Paris.

Roubo died in Paris in 1791. A biography of Roubo was written in 1836 by the architect and carpenter Louis-Auguste Boileau in the series Portraits et histoire des hommes utiles (Portraits and History of Useful Men) published by Franklin Montyon and Company.

== Works ==
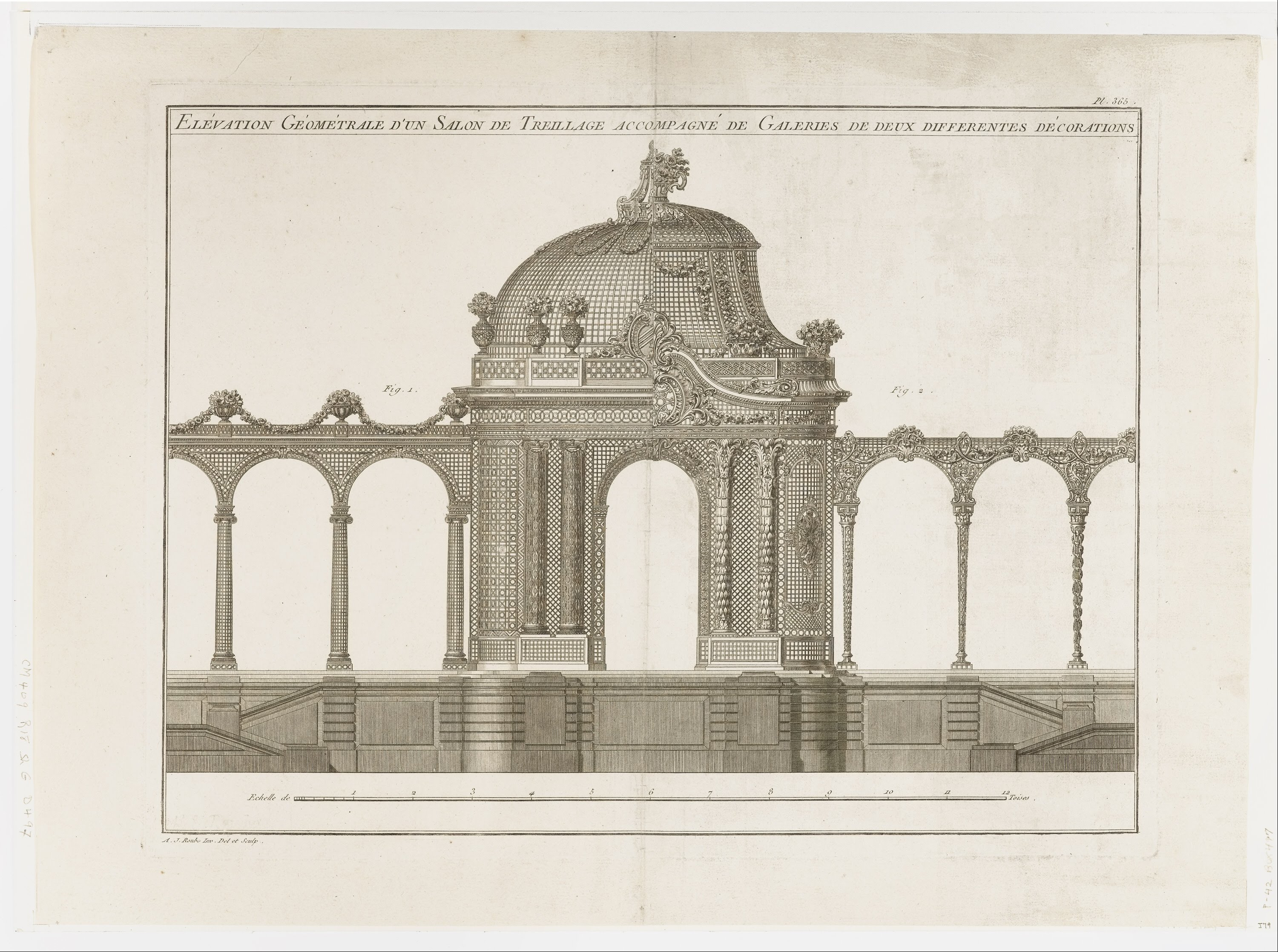
Elevation view of a garden pavilion and latticed gallery, from plate 365 of L'Art de Treillageur ou menuiserie des jardins (1775)

Roubo's comprehensive four-part treatise L’Art du Menuisier (The Art of the Carpenter) was published between 1769 and 1775 by the Académie des Sciences, with the supplementary work L'Art du layetier being published in 1782. L’Art du Menuisier was reprinted in its original format in by Léonce Laget in 1977 and again in 1982. In 2002, the French publisher Bibliothèque de l’Image published an edition at a more affordable price, which also contains L'Art du layetier.

L’Art du Menuisier is divided into four volumes:

- Première partie (building joinery part I) – this part covers basic geometry, types of wood, profiles, assemblages, tools, mobile joinery, shutters and wickets, crosses, and doors.
- Seconde partie (building joinery part II) – this part covers flooring (including parquetry), panelling, interior decoration, liturgical furniture, installation and assembly of joinery, arches and curves, and stairs.
- Troisième partie (specialty woodwork) – the third part consist of three discrete sections: coach construction, furniture, and cabinetmaking.
- Quatrieme partie (garden woodwork) – this part covers the fundamentals of outdoor woodwork and deals with trellis, pilasters & columns, vases & flowerpots.

The original four-volume work consisted of 1316 pages in total and 383 copper engraved plates. Every plate was designed by Roubo and 181 of them are engraved by himself. Sometimes colloquially referred to as "The Roubo", it is considered even today as the best guide for traditional joinery. It develops and discusses in detail the technical knowledge of carpentry that was under Louis XV in its heyday.

Roubo also had an interest in theatrical design, and published a treatise on the construction of theatres and theatrical mechanics in 1777, titled Traité de la construction des théâtres et des machines théâtrales. This was reprinted by Slatkine Reprints in 1984 under the false name of Jacques-André (ISBN 2051006466). However, Roubo only published the first part (the history and architecture of theaters), even though the second part (on theatrical machines) was declared ready to print in 1777. The original work contains 66 pages of text and 10 engravings.

== Roubo's workbench ==
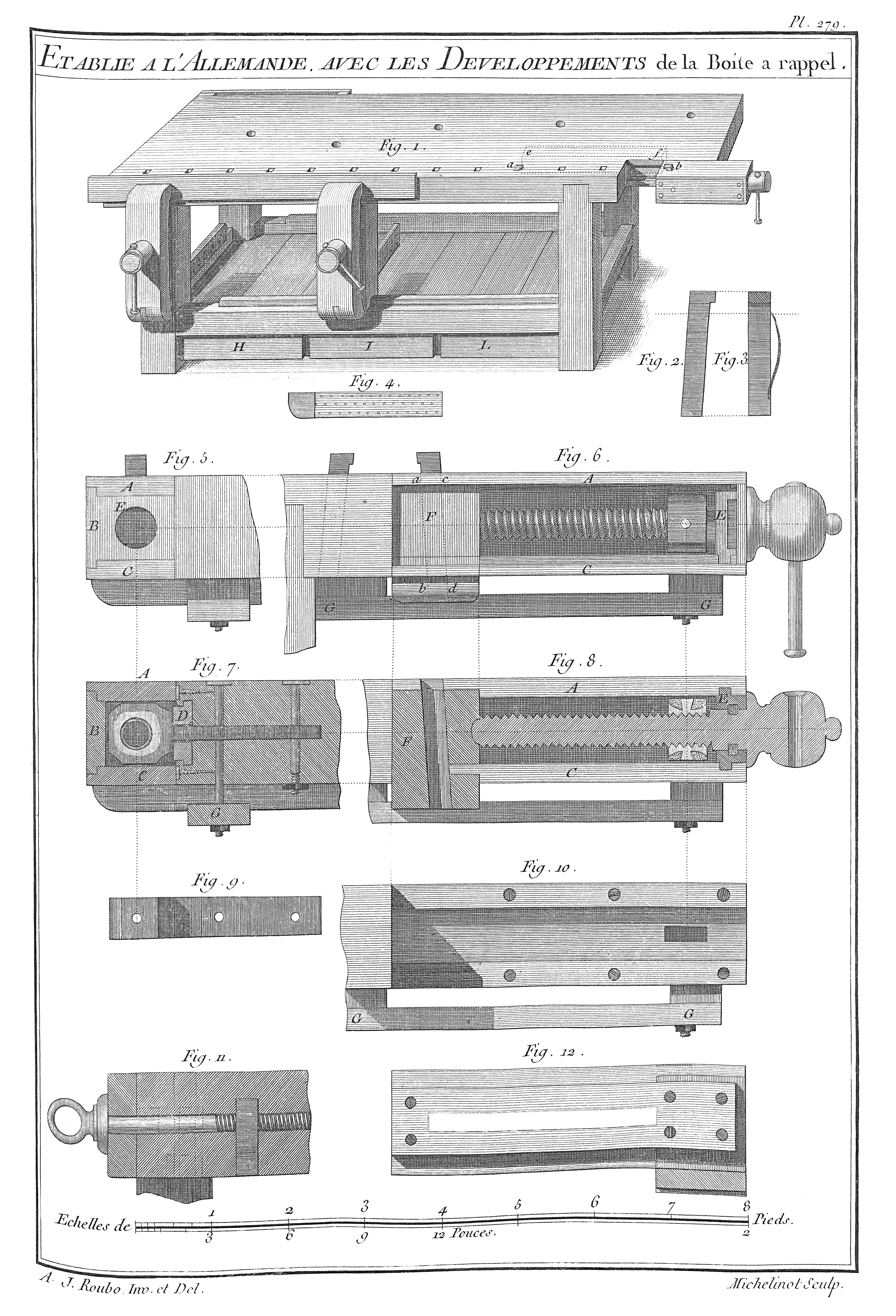
Plate 279 – Workbench in German style..

Roubo's workbench design has gained appreciation from modern woodworkers as a simple and reliable workbench that can be built at home.

== Gallery ==
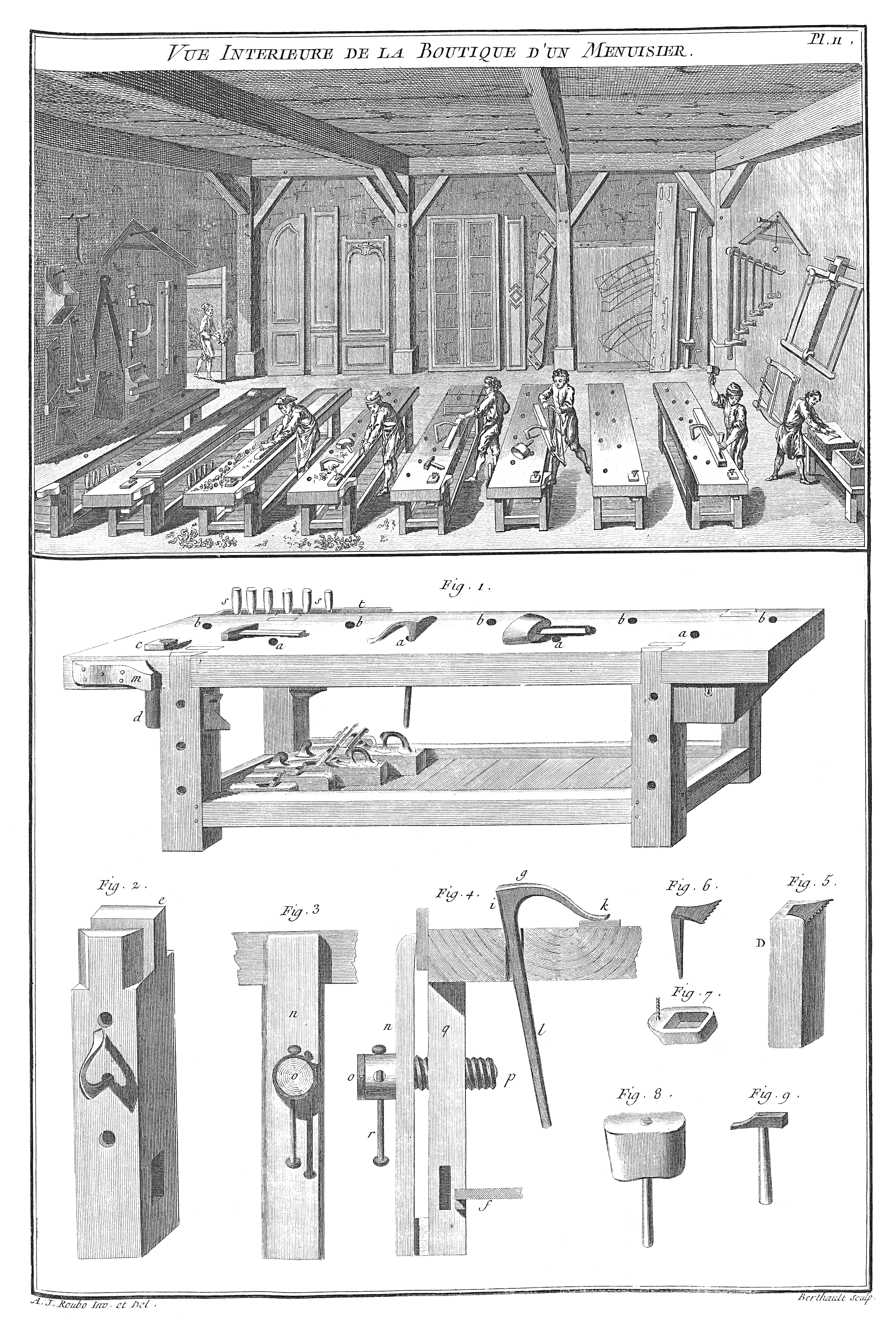
Original design for Roubo's famous workbench

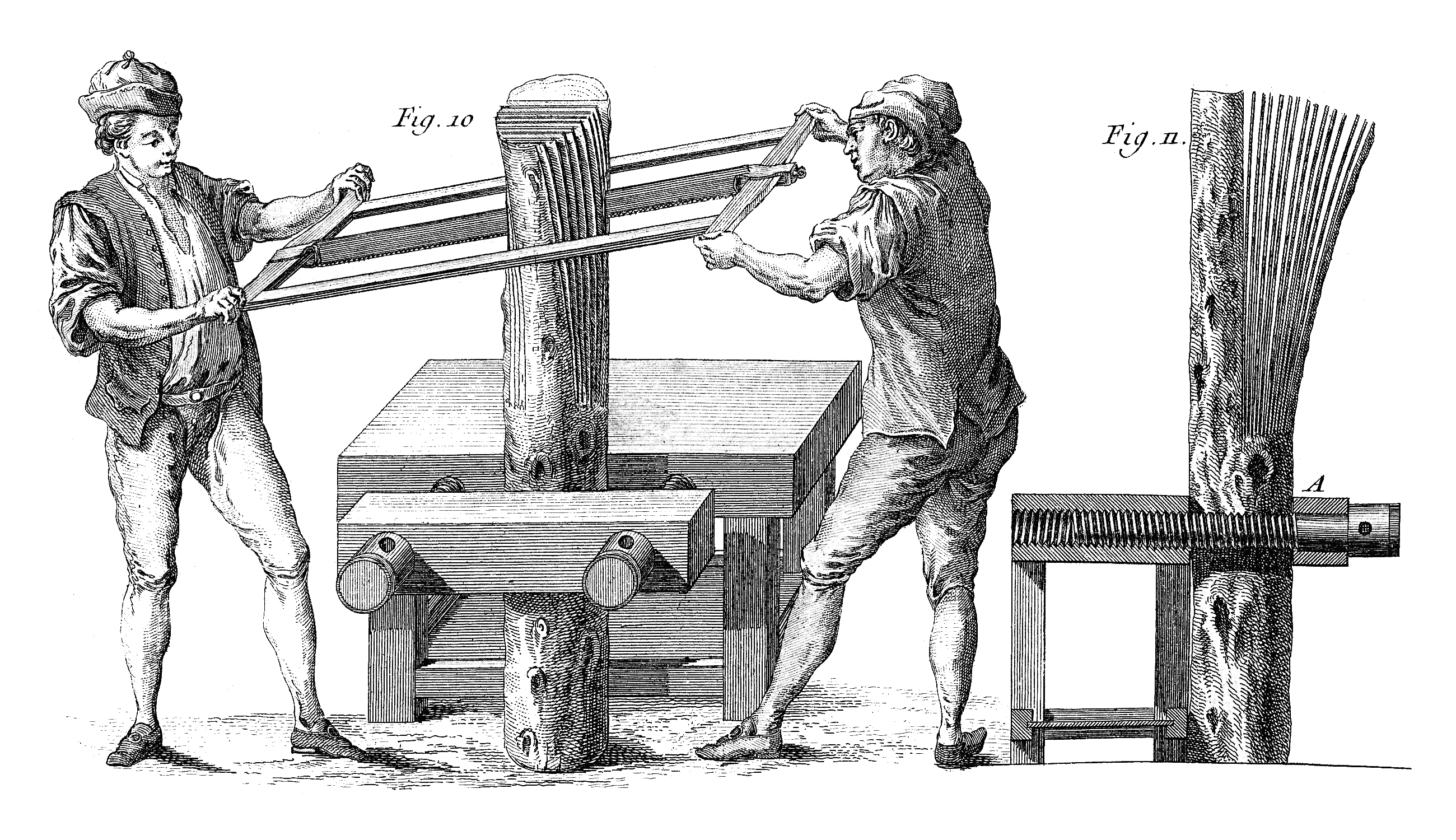
Roubo-era veneering saw

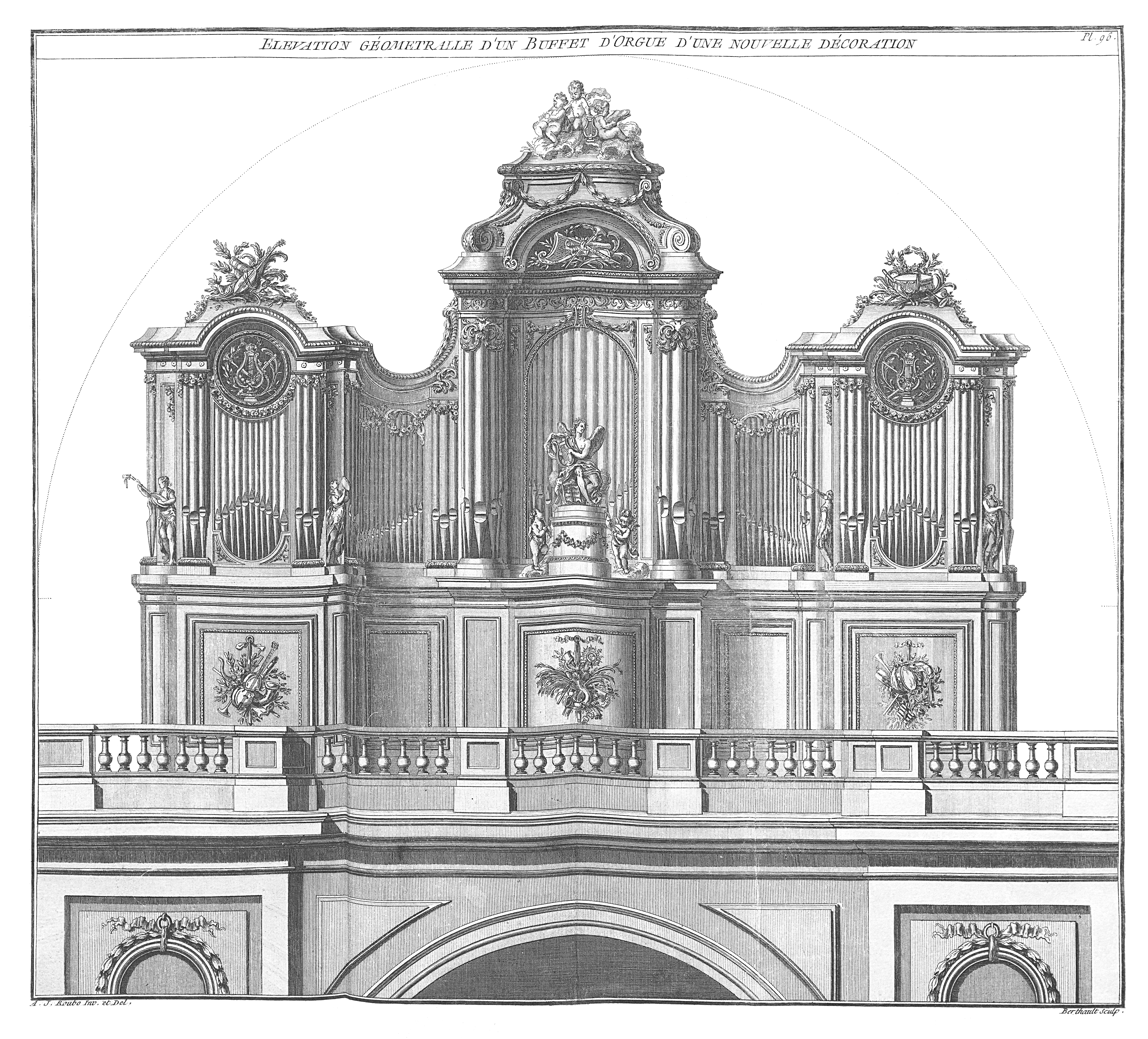
Elevation of a pipe organ designed by Roubo

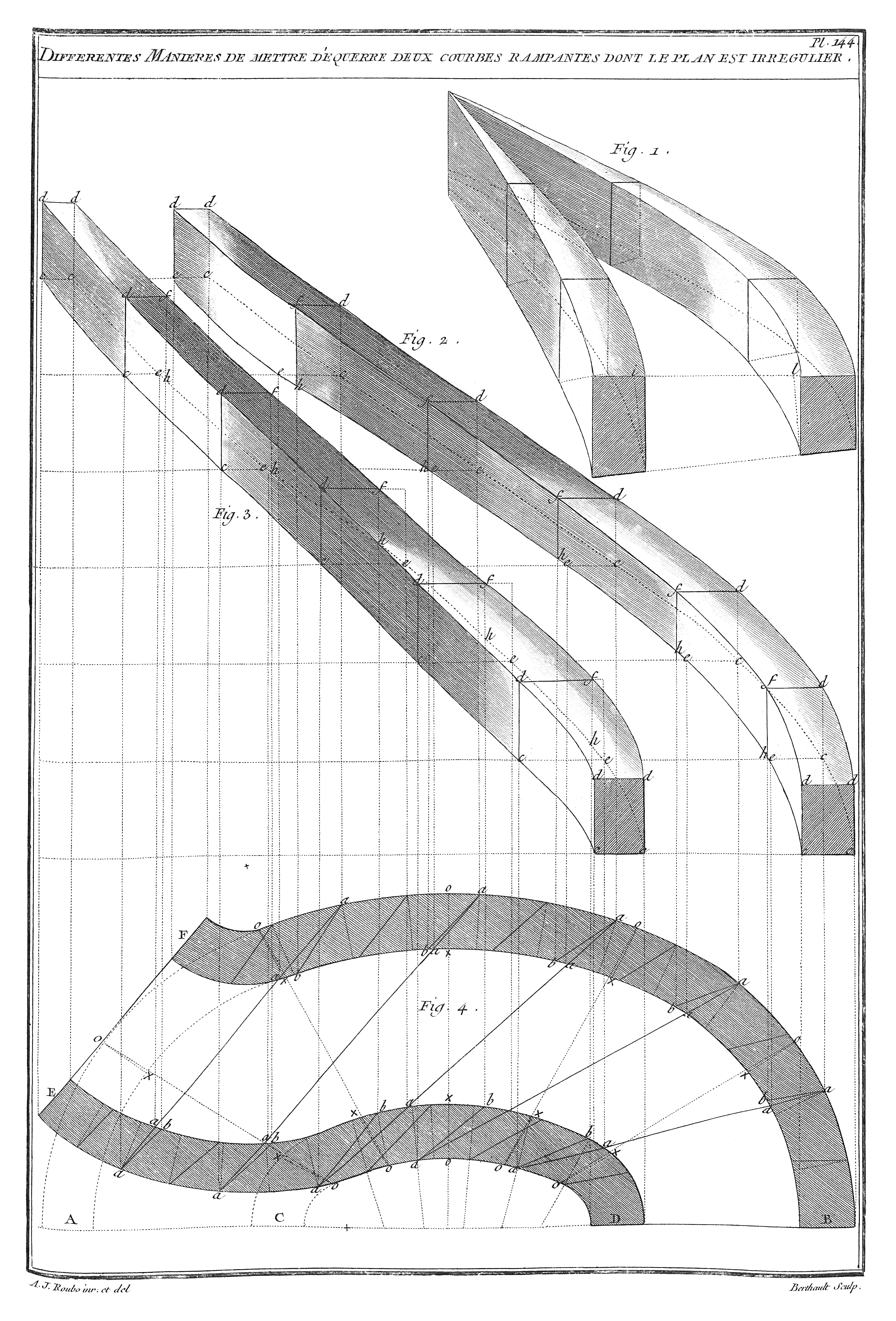
An extract from L’Art du Menuisier

== See also ==
- Ébéniste – French word for cabinetmaker
- Jean-François Blondel – Roubo's tutor
