= FAMAD =

Polish industrial machinery manufacturer

Fabryka Maszyn i Urządzeń Przemysłowych Sp. z o.o.
- Facility building of FAMAD in 2026
- Type: Private
- Industry: Machine industry
- Founded: 1868
- Headquarters: Paczków, Poland
- Area served: Europe; Asia; South America; Africa
- Key people: Mieczysław Fluder
- Website: https://www.famad.com.pl/pl/

Fabryka Maszyn i Urządzeń Przemysłowych Sp. z o.o. (Industrial Machinery and Equipment Factory "FAMAD") is a Polish company based in Paczków, focused on production of equipment used in production processes related to gluing, processing, and finishing of wood; a manufacturer of machines and equipment for the furniture and wood industries, technological transport, and hydraulic cylinders.

== History ==
=== Industry establishment – Kieslich Brothers (1868–1945) ===
In 1868, a 23 year old master blacksmith Joseph Kieslich established a workshop in Paczków where he repaired and built agricultural machinery. The small workshop developed successfully. At that time, its owner, together with his brother Johann, became interested in its further development. On a 12-morgen plot between Młynówka and Kamienica Stream, new facilities were built, a steam engine was purchased, as well as wood and metal processing equipment, resulting in a factory producing horse-drawn carriages and agricultural machinery. From 1882 onwards, in addition to agricultural machines, fire pumps were also produced. The establishment advertised itself as: "Kieslich Brothers – machinery, carriages, and fire pumps".

The company quickly gained customers' recognition and soon employed 100 workers. In the initial phase, fire pumps were built at the plant according to its own design. The two-wheeled equipment was an interesting technical solution in which, with the help of a threaded spindle, the pump was moved towards the drawbar to ensure the pump's stability during operation. This solution was registered with the Patent Office. Around 1891, the Kieslich brothers began producing fire pumps in close cooperation with the well-known company F. C. Flader. The production utilized complete pumping devices from this company and incorporated them into the wagons produced in-house. At that time, eight types of fire pumps and water transport vehicles were offered, which were showcased in various catalogs. Distinguishing the equipment produced in Paczków back then, without a factory label, from the products of the Flader company was practically impossible. In this way, a large assortment of equipment by the Kieslich brothers' company was created; however, the production of the equipment still largely involved manual work, which made the rationalization of production impossible.

Kieslich Brothers Stanisława Staszica Street facility building

After the expansion in 1902, mass production in separate halls became possible. The production of other firefighting equipment also developed. Hand-operated pressure fire pumps, motor pumps, folding ladders, turntable ladders, and steam fire engines were also manufactured, as well as equipment for transporting people and water. Upon the customer's request, complete firefighting equipment was supplied, although not all the equipment shown in the catalogs was produced at the factory. After the expiration of the Flader company's patent, the pumps were equipped with manufacturers' own pumps. The company achieved great success primarily in the production of ladders of its own design. Some of these were patented, and the factory gained wide markets. Further expansion took place in 1904 and 1908. In the meantime, the factory expanded to include buildings at Pocztowa 3 Street and on Stanisława Staszica Street. In the beginning of 1911, the company was taken over by the founder's son, certified engineer Karol Kieslich, who continued to run it under the existing name.

Kieslich Brothers main production facility

The area of the plant increased to 40,000 m^{2} (430,000 ft^{2}) and consisted of a complex of 15 different buildings. Various types of equipment were operated by a 400 horsepower (300 kW) steam engine. The plant had its own sawmill and timber yard, which provided raw material of suitable quality for production. "Schlesische Feuerwhergerate und Maschinen-fabrik" (Silesian Fire Equipment and Machinery Factory) was the largest factory of its kind in Silesia and employed over 300 workers and laborers. In 1912, preparations began in Paczków for the production of fire engines and ladders mounted on Daimler vehicles. In the summer of 1920, the plant simultaneously produced 13 motorized fire engines, 5 motorized ladders, numerous vehicle trailers for transporting equipment, as well as a large number of hand-operated fire pumps and portable extension ladders. At the same time, orders amounted to a further 60 units of motorized fire engines and ladders.

In 1927, the factory produced horse-drawn fire pumps with manual and gasoline drives, mounted turntable ladders, and firefighting fittings. It continued to manufacture agricultural machinery: threshers of the "stift" type with manual, treadwheel, and motor drives, cleaning threshers of the "stift" and "flail" systems, seeders for mountainous and flat areas, winnowers and grain cleaning mills, and three-roll mangles for domestic use. Thanks to the export of equipment, the plant survived the severe period of hyperinflation between 1922 and 1923 and returned to its previous condition. However, the global economic crisis in 1929 caused a lack of orders and ultimately led to the company's bankruptcy. With the collapse of the enterprise, the last owner, Karol Kieslich, and 350 employees lost their source of income. After the company's failure, Karol Kieslich ran a small business: "Certified Engineer Karol Kieslich – Equipment Plant for Firefighting Equipment and Accessories", selling equipment produced by other companies.

The last mention of its existence dates back to September 1938. The main building complex between Młynówka and Kamienica Stream was purchased by the town, which set up a labor camp there. In 1938, the factory buildings along with the land were resold to the Müller brothers, who established chemical industry production there. The premises on Staszica Street were purchased in 1929 by the Biedermann brothers, who set up a factory for gilded and natural frames. In the same year, one of the brothers also bought part of the plant at Pocztowa 8 Street, where artificial wines and beer malt were produced.

==== Herbert Hauschild – Firefighting Equipment Factory ====
In 1929, the former paint shop at Pocztowa 3 Street was taken over by Hauschild Junior. On its basis, he established a company under the name: "Herbert Hauschild Feuerwehr-geratefabrik" (Herbert Hauschild Firefighting Equipment Factory). He employed some of the specialists from the firefighting equipment factory, successfully producing fixed extendable ladders and ladders on vehicle chassis, as well as sports equipment: skis, sleds, vaulting horses, ladders, and gym rails. During World War II, the plant was considered important for fire defense and, as such, was primarily focused on the production of fire ladders, including 12 m (39 ft 4 in) two-wheeled mechanical ladders. Ammunition crates were also produced. At that time, the plant employed 45 workers in two shifts.

==== Match factory ====
The match factory (Zündholtzfabrik), Gierth & Ergmann, was established in Paczków at the current address of Kopernika 1 Street in 1842. Phosphorus-sulfur matches were produced manually. The factory was acquired in 1877 by Julius Huch. It received the name: "Fabrik chemischer Zündwaren" (Factory of Chemical Ignition Materials). Huch introduced far-reaching technical innovations, modernized the plant, and over the years, the existing phosphorus-sulfur matches were replaced with safety matches. The plant faced various adversities. Two fires in Paczków destroyed most of the facility. The introduction of a match tax, competition with large corporations, as well as the dumping sales practiced by the Swedes and Russians, often led to difficult periods for the factory. When Julius Huch moved to Berlin, he left the management of the plant to his long-time collaborator, Director Albert Huch.

=== Fabryka Części Pożarniczych i Sportowych (1945–1951) ===
After the end of World War II, as part of the industrial nationalization reform, the plant was nationalized on 1 July 1945, and began operating under the name: "Firefighting and Sports Parts Factory" (Polish: Fabryka Części Pożarniczych i Sportowych) Until April 1946, the plant was subordinated to the management of the Automotive Industry in Warsaw. The company had an adequate machinery park and a six-month supply of raw materials. Work in the plant was carried out in three rooms. The workforce consisted of 16 people, including 2 white-collar employees. The position of manager, and from 1950, director of the plant, was assumed by Marian Kostka. In 1945, the plant produced a 12 m (39 ft 4 in) two-wheeled mechanical ladder (1 unit), Szczerbowski ladders (10 units), hook ladders (10 units), and extension ladders (40 units).

The plant encountered difficulties in streamlining production, so the first products were manufactured according to German standards. In addition, small quantities of sleds and skis of various lengths were produced. Between 1946 and 1947, the plant was under the Southern Association of the Metal Industry in Głuchołazy, while from 1947 it was subordinated to the Local Industry Board based in Katowice. Between 1949 and 1950, the company took over the mechanical carpentry workshop at Pocztowa 8 Street, as well as the facilities of the former match factory at the current Kopernika 1 Street. There, after adapting the premises, the production department for ladders and wooden semi-finished products was located, while the metal production department remained at its former location at Pocztowa 3 Street. During this period, the plant included:

- Locksmith at Pocztowa 3 Street
- Assembly department at Kopernika 1 Street
- Mechanical carpentry at Pocztowa 8 street
- Graphic works at Wojska Polskiego 28 Street

A larger production area, with 128 employees at the end of 1951, contributed to the development of the company, as evidenced by the expanded range of products and their improved quality. The main specialty of the plant was fire ladders, manufactured in accordance with the standards and requirements of the Main Fire Brigade Headquarters. The plant in Paczków became the only producer of fire ladders in Poland. At that time, the plant produced:

- Two-wheeled 12 and 17 m (39 ft 4 in and 55 ft 9 in) ladders
- 14 m (45 ft 11 in) rod ladders
- 10 m (32 ft 10 in) Szczerbowski ladders
- Hook ladders
- Column ladders
- Socket ladders
- Heavy-duty 5 and 6 m (16 ft 5 in and 19 ft 8 in) portable ladders
- Light 3.8 m (12 ft 6 in) leaning ladders
