= Little Giant (disambiguation) =

Little Giant is a 1946 Abbott and Costello film.

Little Giant or Little Giants may also refer to:

== People ==
- Stephen A. Douglas (1813–1861), American politician defeated by Abraham Lincoln in the 1860 presidential election
- Johnny Griffin (1928–2008), American jazz saxophonist

== Film and television ==
- The Little Giant (1926 film), an American silent comedy film
- The Little Giant (1933 film), a film starring Edward G. Robinson
- Little Giants, a 1994 comedy featuring Rick Moranis and Ed O'Neill
- The Small Giant, a French cartoon series

== Other uses ==
- Wabash Little Giants, the athletics teams of Wabash College, beginning in 1884
- Newark Little Giants, a professional baseball team based in Newark, New Jersey in the late 1880s
- The Little Giant (album), a 1959 album by Johnny Griffin and his all-star sextet
- Little Giant Ladder System, manufactured by Wing Enterprises, founded in the 1970s
- Little Giant (album), 2014 studio album by Roo Panes
- Little Giant trucks, manufactured by Chicago Pneumatic between 1911 and 1917.
- Nickname of the Pittsburgh and Lake Erie Railroad
