= Nosing =

Nosing may refer to:

- Stair nosing; the protruding edge of a stair
- The action of using one's nose to smell aromas; as in "nosing wine"
- To meddle or pry in another's personal business
