= Ladder =

Vertical or steeply inclined set of rungs or steps

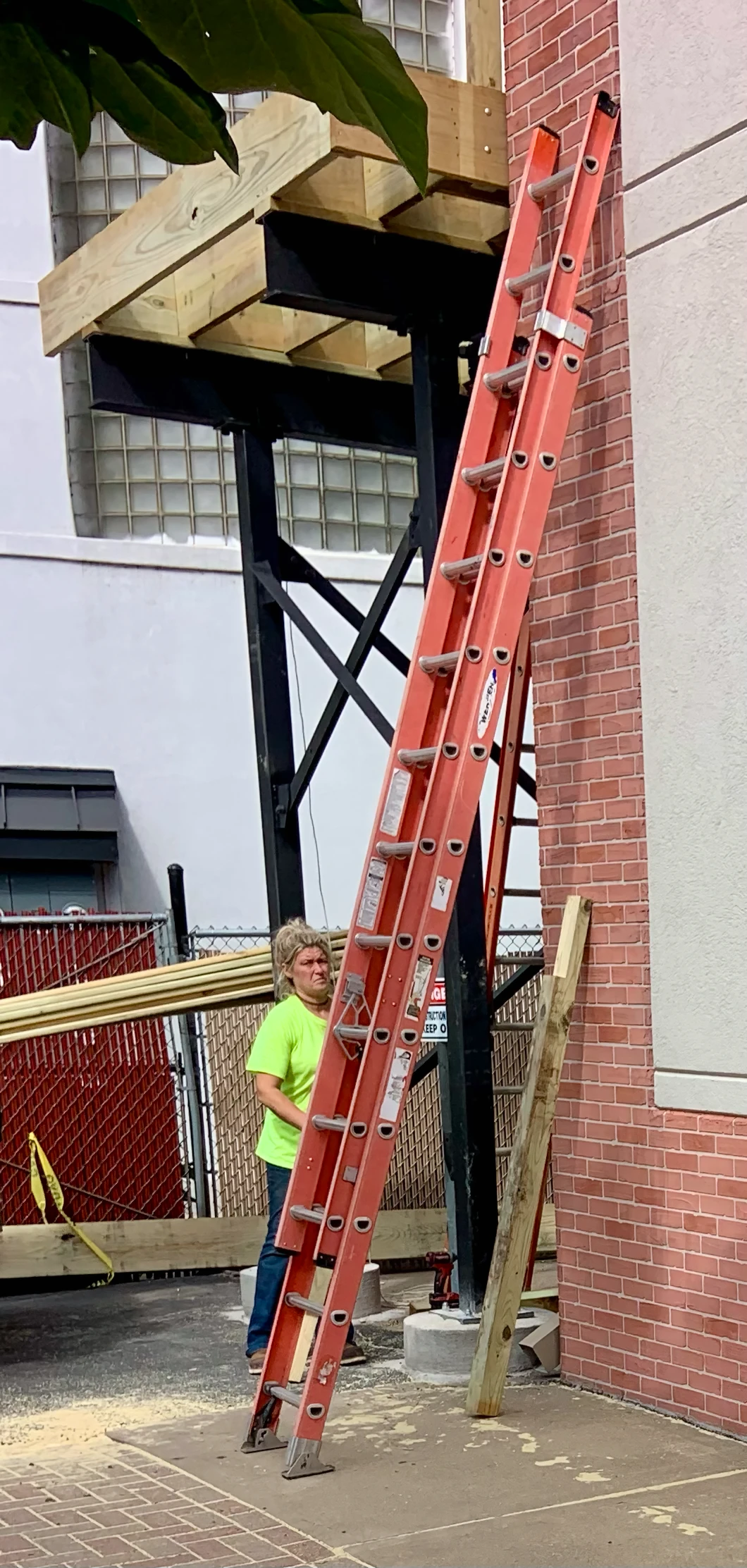
Extension ladder

A ladder is a vertical or inclined set of rungs or steps commonly used for climbing or descending. There are two types: rigid ladders that are self-supporting or that may be leaned against a vertical surface such as a wall, and flexible ladders, such as those made of rope or wire rope, that may be hung from the top.

The vertical members of a rigid ladder are called "stringers" or "rails" (US) or "stiles" (UK). Rigid ladders are usually portable, but some types are permanently fixed to a structure, building, or equipment. They are commonly made of metal, wood, fiberglass, or tough plastic.

== Historical usages ==
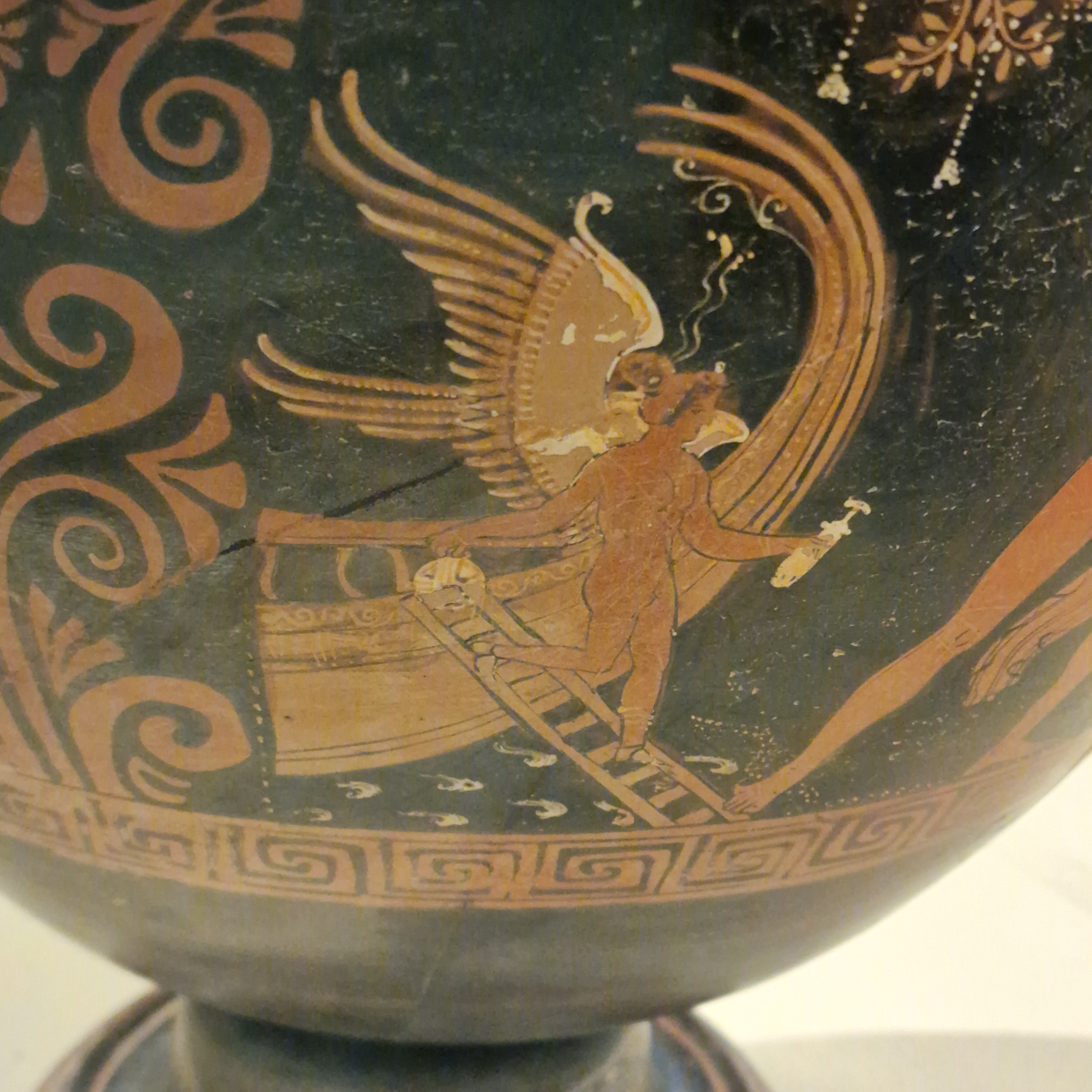
Ladder to board a ship, depicted on volute krater, 340 BC, Musée d'Art et d'Histoire (Geneva)

Ladders are ancient tools and technology. A ladder is featured in a Mesolithic rock painting that is depicted in the Spider Caves in Valencia, Spain. The painting depicts a human using a ladder to harvest honey. The ladder is long and flexible, possibly made of some sort of grass. There are also numerous other such examples in Spain.

== Variations ==
=== Rigid ladders ===
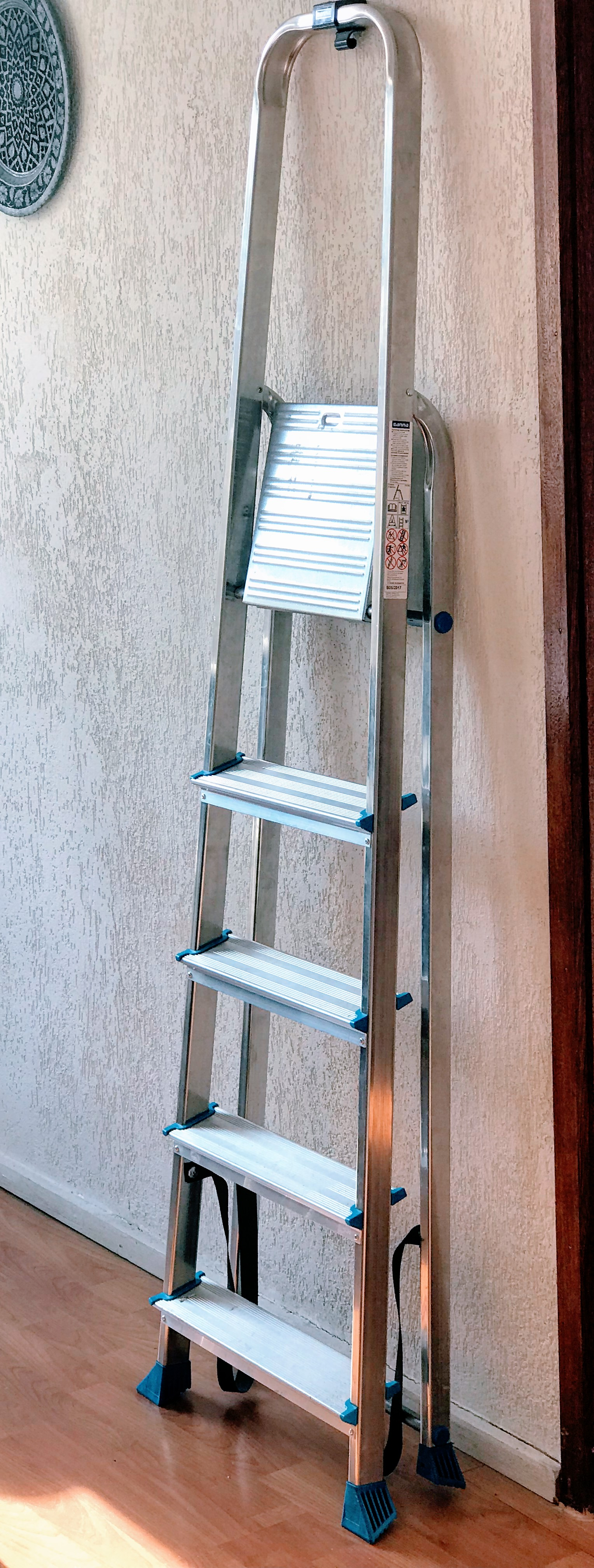
An aluminum stepladder, folded

Rigid ladders are available in many forms, such as:

- Accommodation ladder, portable steps down the side of a ship for boarding.
- Assault ladder, used in siege warfare to assist in climbing walls and crossing moats.
- Attic ladder, pulled down from the ceiling to allow access to an attic or loft.
- Bridge ladder, a ladder laid horizontally to act as a passage between two points separated by a drop.
- Boarding ladder, a ladder used to climb onto a vehicle. May be rigid or flexible, also boarding step(s), and swim ladder.
- Cat ladder (US chicken ladder), a lightweight ladder frame used on steep roofs to prevent workers from sliding.
- Chicken ladder, a ladder comprising a single central stile with each rung projecting on either side and used by chickens to climb into a coop.
- Christmas tree ladder, a type of boarding ladder for divers which has a single central rail and is open at the sides to allow the diver to climb the ladder while wearing swimfins.
- Counterbalanced ladder, a fixed ladder with a lower sliding part. A system of counterweights is used to let the lower sliding part descend gently when released.
- Escape ladder, a ladder used for emergency exit, for example a fire escape ladder
- Extension ladder or telescopic ladder, a fixed ladder divided into two or more lengths for more convenient storage; the lengths can be slid together for storage or slid apart to expand the length of the ladder; a pulley system may be fitted so that the ladder can be easily extended by an operator on the ground then locked in place using the dogs and pawls. 65 ft (20 m), 50 ft (15 m) and some 35 ft (10 m) extension ladders for fire service use "bangor poles", "tormentor poles" or "stay poles" to help raise, pivot, steady, extend, place, retract and lower them due to the heavy weight.
- Fixed ladder, two side members joined by several rungs; affixed to structure with no moving parts.
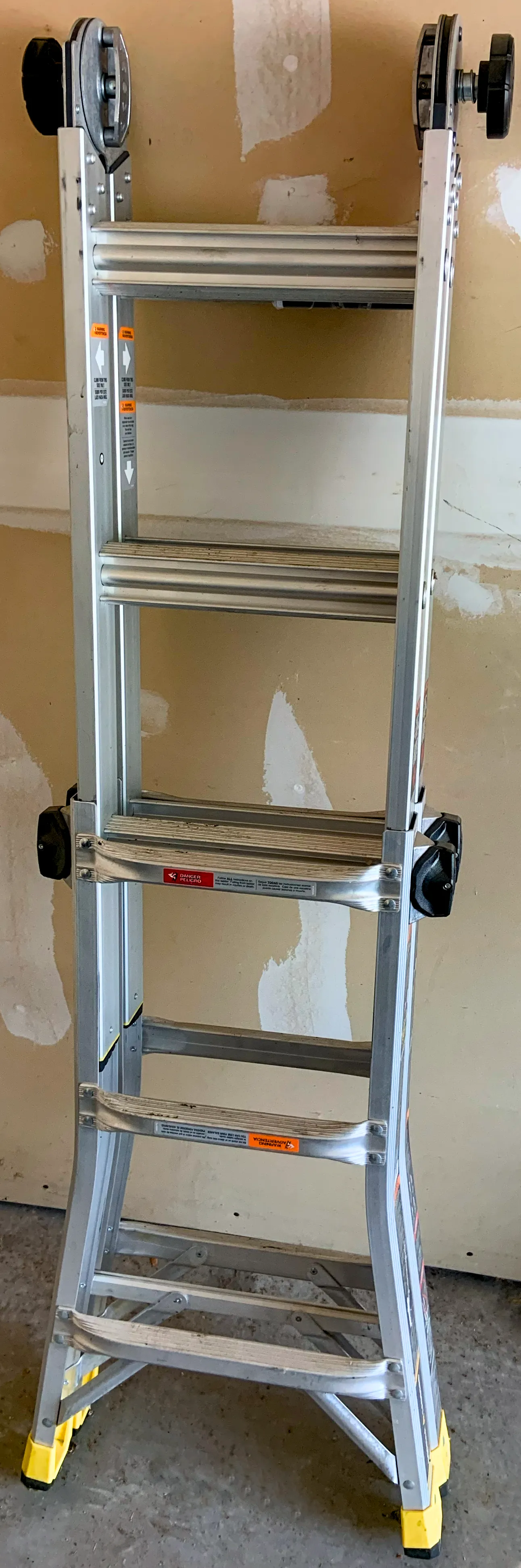
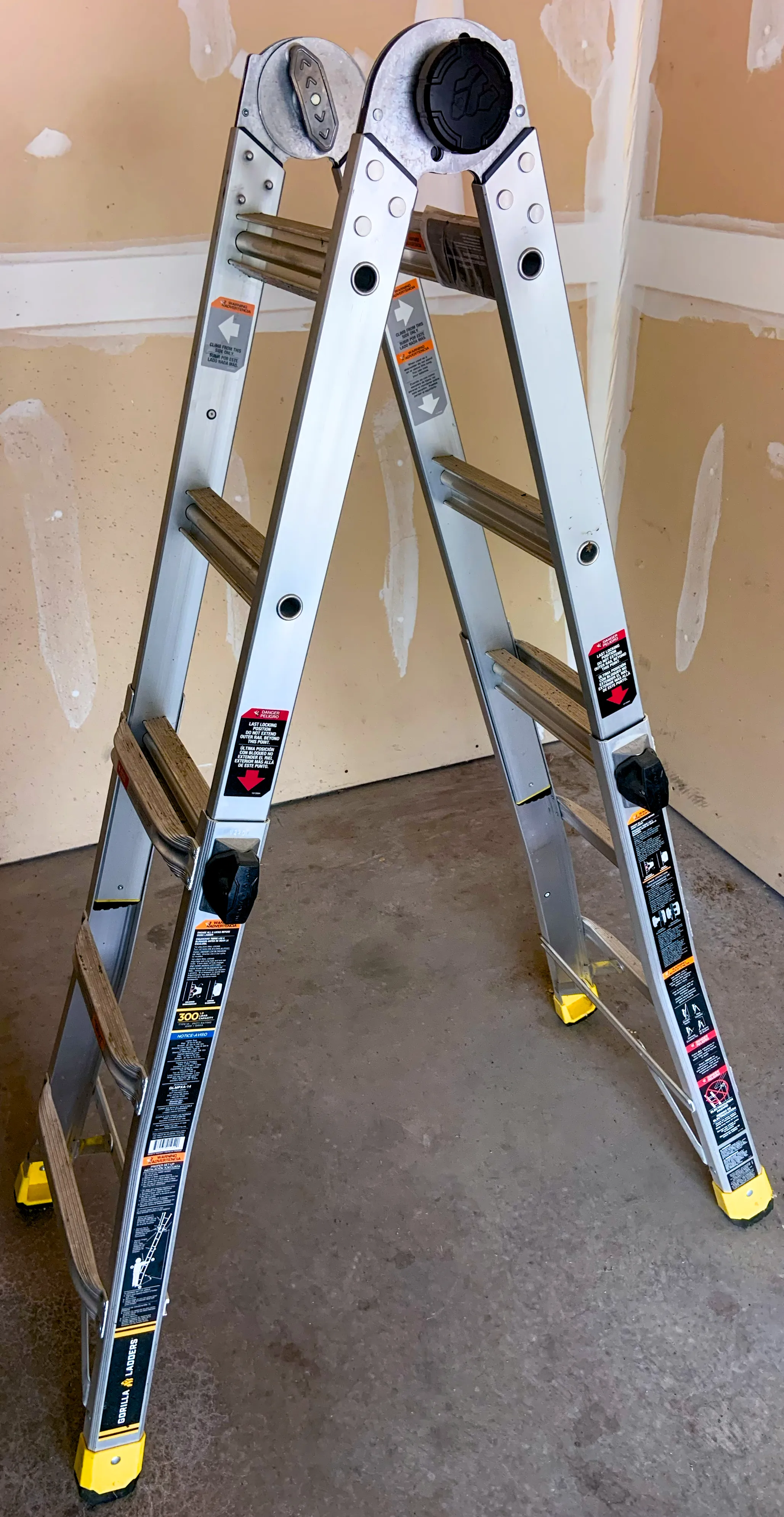
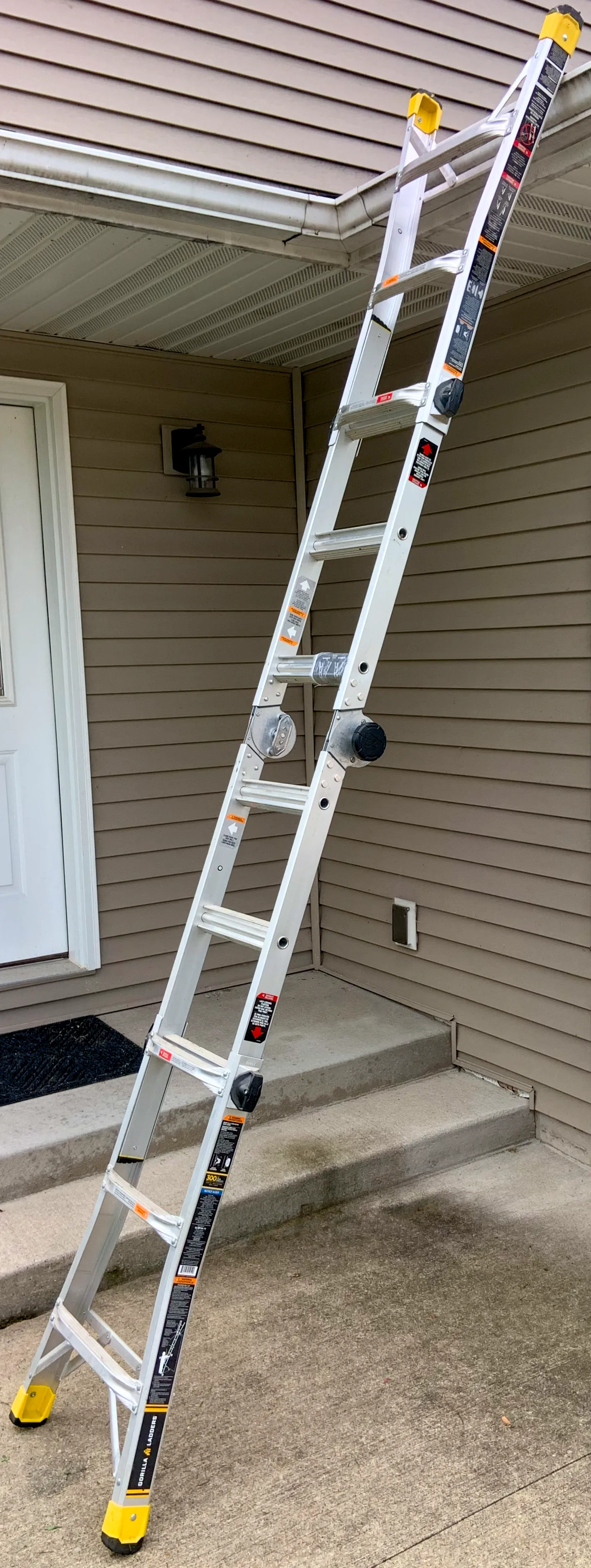
Folding ladder
- Folding ladder, a ladder in the step ladder style with one or more (usually no more than three) lockable one-way hinges. Ideal for use on uneven ground (e.g. stairs), as a trestle, or when fully extended a fixed ladder. Some variations feature a central one-way hinge with extensible locking legs.
- Hook ladder or pompier ladder, a rigid ladder with a hook at the top to grip a windowsill; used by firefighters.

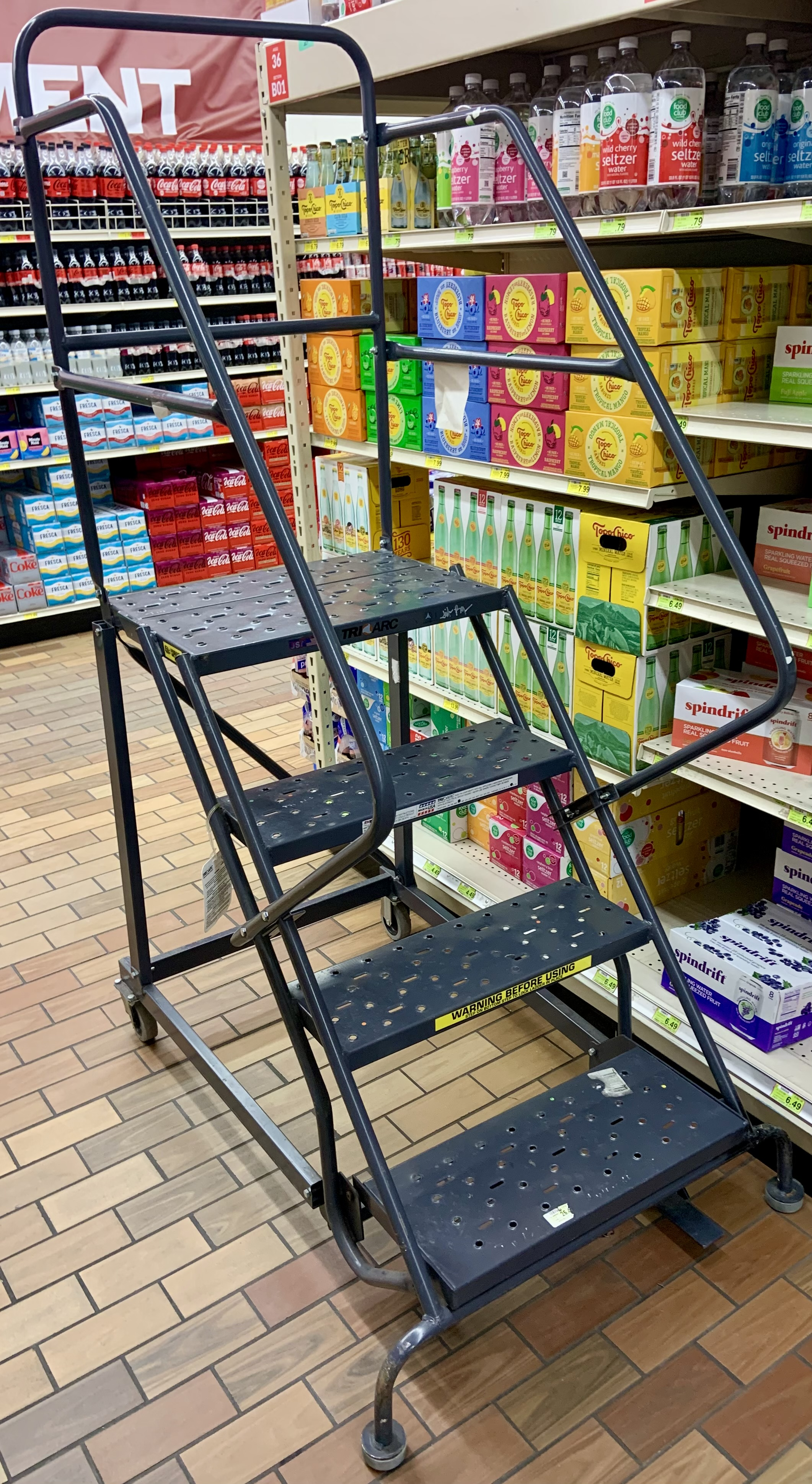
Mobile safety steps at a grocery store

- Mobile Safety Steps are self-supporting structures that have wheels or castors making them easy to move. They sometimes have a small upper platform and a hand rail to assist in moving up and down the steps.
- Orchard ladder, a three-legged step ladder with the third leg made so that it can be inserted between tree branches for fruit picking.
- Platform ladder, a step ladder with a large platform area and a top handrail for the user to hold while working on the platform.
- Retractable ladder, a ladder that looks like a drainpipe but can be deployed instantly when required.
- Roof ladder, a rigid ladder with a large hook at the top to grip the ridge of a pitched roof.
- Sectional ladder, also known as a builder's ladder, has sections that come apart and are interchangeable so that any number of sections can be connected.
- Step ladder, a self-supporting portable ladder hinged in the middle to form an inverted V, with stays to keep the two halves at a fixed angle. Step ladders have flat steps and a hinged back.
- Swim ladder, a ladder used by swimmers to get out of the water, often on boats.
- Telescoping ladder, commonly used to refer to a hybrid between a step ladder and an extension ladder with 360-degree hinges; has three parts and can be taken apart to form two step ladders; e.g. Little Giant.
- Trestle ladder, an "A-Frame"-style ladder with a telescoping center section.
- Turntable ladder, an extension ladder fitted to rotating platform on top of a fire truck.
- Vertically rising ladder, designed to climb high points and facilitate suspending at said high points.
- X-deck ladder, a US patented ladder design that is a combination ladder and scaffold.

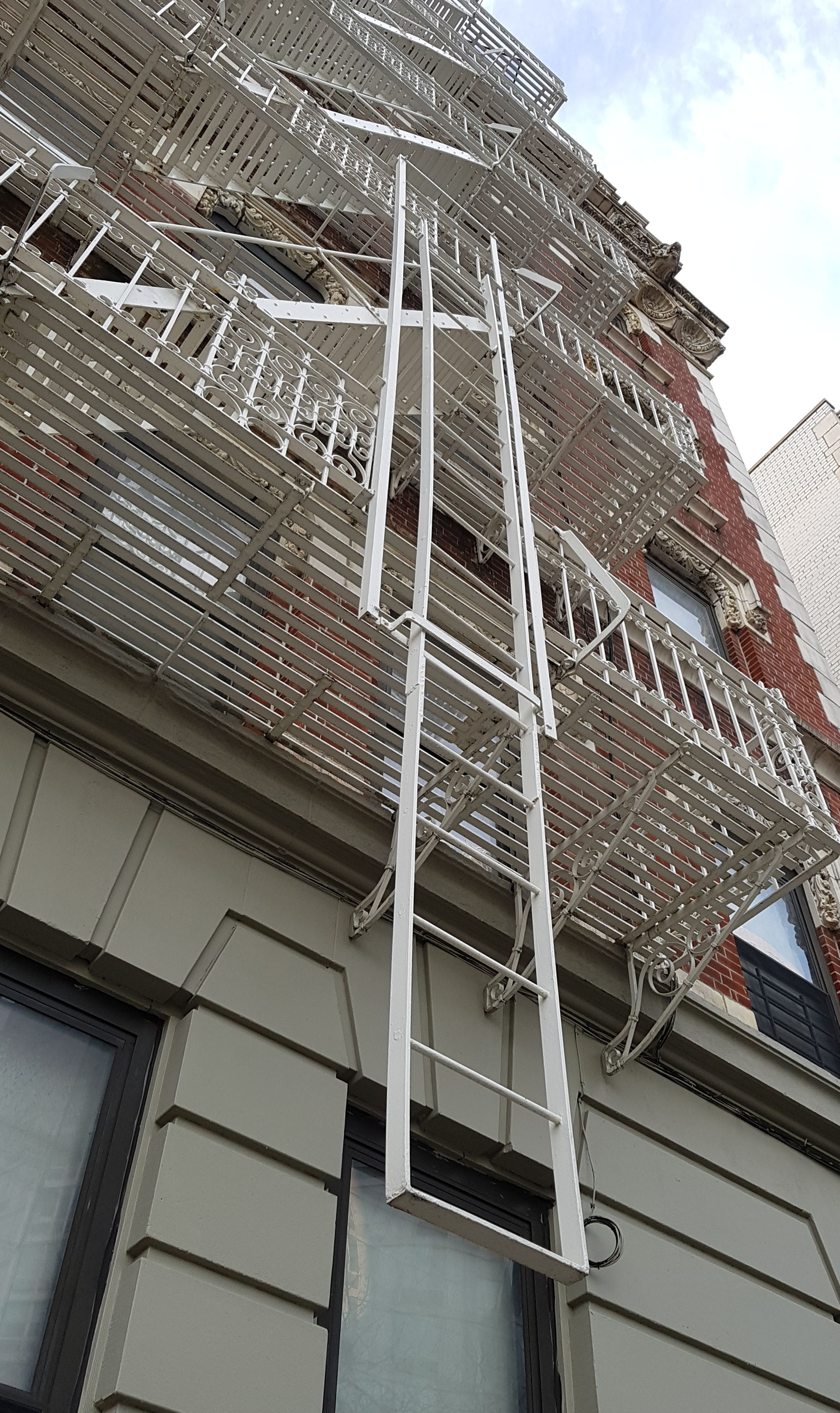
Ladder of a fire escape in New York City

Rigid ladders were originally made of wood, but in the 20th century aluminum became more common because of its lighter weight. Ladders with fiberglass stiles are used for working on or near overhead electrical wires, because fiberglass is an electrical insulator. Henry Quackenbush patented the extension ladder in 1867.

=== Flexible ladders ===
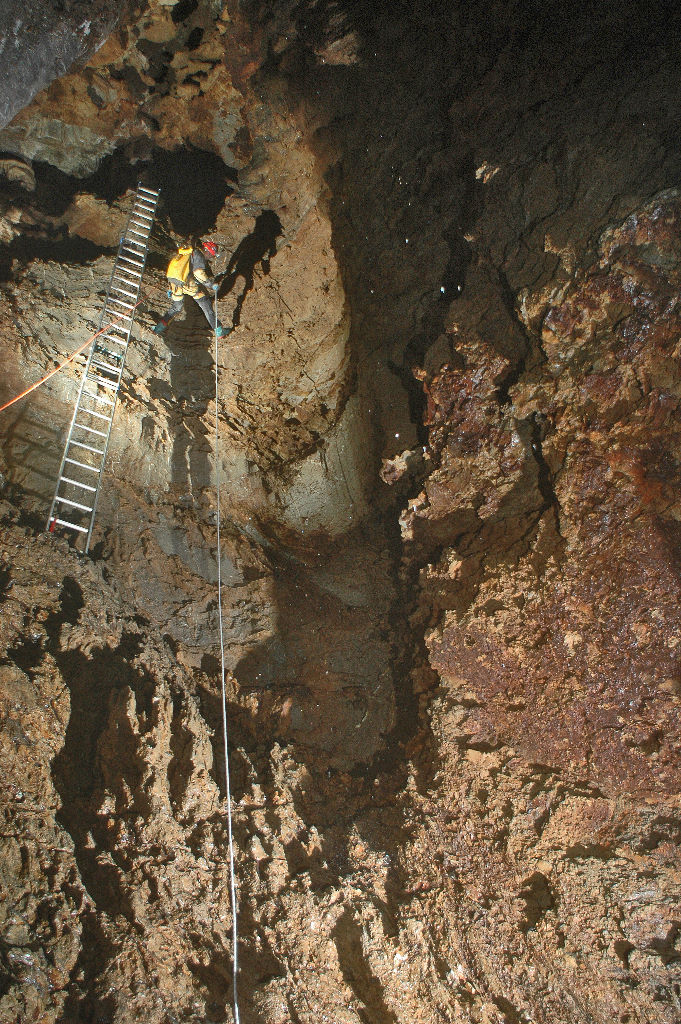
An aluminum ladder being used in Riverbend Cave, 2006

- Rope ladders or Jacob's ladders are used where storage space is extremely limited, weight must be kept to a minimum, or in instances where the object to be climbed is too curved to use a rigid ladder. They may have rigid or flexible rungs. Climbing a rope ladder requires more skill than climbing a rigid ladder, because the ladder tends to swing like a pendulum. Jacob's ladders used on a ship are used mostly for emergencies or for temporary access to the side of a ship. Steel and aluminum wire ladders are sometimes used in vertical caving, having developed from rope ladders with wooden rungs. Flexible ladders are also sometimes used as swim ladders on boats.

== Uses ==
- Dissipative ladders are portable ladders built to ESD (Electrostatic Discharge) standard. Electrostatic Discharge is a natural occurrence in which electricity is passed through the body, or other conductors, and discharges onto some object. For example, the shock sometimes felt when a doorknob is touched is an ESD. This natural occurrence is a very important topic in the field of electronics assembly due to the costly damage ESDs can cause to sensitive electronic equipment. Dissipative ladders are ladders with controlled electrical resistance: the resistance slows the transfer of charge from one point to another, offering increased protection during ESD events: ≥10^{5} and < 10^{12} Ω / square.
- Boarding and pool ladders, also swim ladders and dive ladders. A ladder may be used on the side or stern of a boat, to climb into it from the water, and in a swimming pool, to climb out and sometimes in. Swimming pool ladders are usually made from plastic, wood or metal steps with a textured upper surface for grip and metal rails at the sides to support the steps and as handrails for the user, and are usually fixed in place. Boarding ladders for boats may be fixed, but are usually portable, and often fold away when not in use to avoid drag when under way. Boarding ladders may also be used for other types of vehicle, or boarding steps which are supported directly by the vehicle structure.
- Assault ladders are lightweight portable ladders designed for quick placement, to allow scaling walls and cliffs during military attacks.

== Safety ==
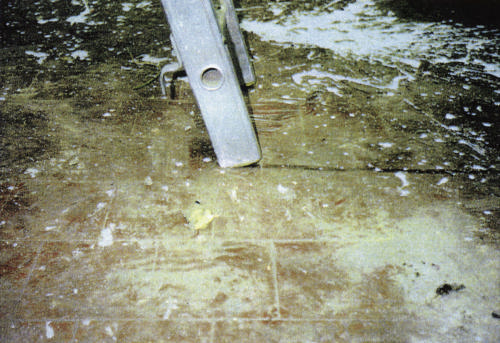
Skid mark made by a faulty ladder

The most common injury made by ladder climbers is bruising from falling off a ladder, but bone fractures are common and head injuries are also likely, depending on the nature of the accident. In addition to simple falls, the ladders themselves can also cause injury if they slip or slide on their support surface.

To avoid this, many ladders have flexible plastic or rubber feet or base pads which increase friction with the ground. However, if the friction foot is badly worn, smooth metal may contact a hard surface, increasing the chance of an accident. Ladder stabilizers are also available to increase the ladder's grip on the ground. One of the first ladder stabilizers or ladder feet was offered in 1936, and today they are standard equipment on most large ladders.

A common design for a ladder foot allows a pivoting flat friction foot to be used on relatively firm, level surfaces. For softer ground, the ladder foot can be pivoted so that a sharp toothed metal plate can be dug into the surface for better anchoring. For use on non-level ground, special ladder leveler extension legs can be extended or attached to compensate for the uneven terrain.

A ladder standoff, stay, or stabilizer is a device fitted to the top of a ladder to hold it away from the wall. This enables the ladder to clear overhanging obstacles, such as the eaves of a roof, and increases the safe working height for a given length of ladder, because of the increased side-to-side separation distance of the two contact points at the top of the ladder.

It has become increasingly common to provide permanent anchor points on buildings to which the top rung of an extension ladder can be attached, especially for recurring activities like window cleaning. This is especially important if a fellow worker is not available for "footing" the ladder. Footing occurs when another worker stands on the lowest rung and so provides much greater stability to the ladder when being used. However footing a ladder should be seen as a last resort for a safe placement. The anchor point is often a ring cemented into a slot in a masonry wall to which the rungs of a ladder can be attached using rope for example, or a carabiner.

== Ladder classes ==
The European Union and the UK have established a ladder certification system (ladder classes) for any ladders manufactured or sold in Europe. The certification classes apply solely to ladders that are portable, such as stepladders and extension ladders, and are broken down into three types of certification. Each ladder certification is designated by a color-coded label to indicate the amount of weight the ladder is designed to hold, the certification class, and its use.

- Class 1 ladder – for heavy-duty industrial uses, maximum load of 175 kg, color-coded blue
- Class EN131 ladders – for commercial uses, maximum load of 150 kg, no specific color code
- Class III ladders – for light, domestic uses, maximum load of 125 kg, color-coded red

The US has established a similar classification of ladders, based on rated carrying capacity:

- Type IAA (Extra Heavy Duty) – 375 pounds
- Type IA (Extra Heavy Duty) – 300 pounds
- Type I (Heavy Duty) – 250 pounds
- Type II (Medium Duty) – 225 pounds
- Type III (Light Duty) – 200 pounds

== Society and culture ==
A common superstition in English-speaking countries is that walking under a ladder is seen as bad luck. Some sources claim that this stems from the image of a ladder being propped up against a wall looking similar to a gallows, while others attribute it to ancient Egyptian traditions involving pyramids and triangles representing the trinity of the gods, and passing through the triangular shape made by a ladder against a wall was seen as desecration. Ladders have also been linked to the crucifixion of Christ, with author and scientist Charles Panati noting that many believe a ladder rested against the cross that Christ hung from, making it a symbol of wickedness, betrayal and death. In comedic children's media, the image of a character walking under a ladder being the cause or result of bad luck has become a common trope.

== Image gallery ==
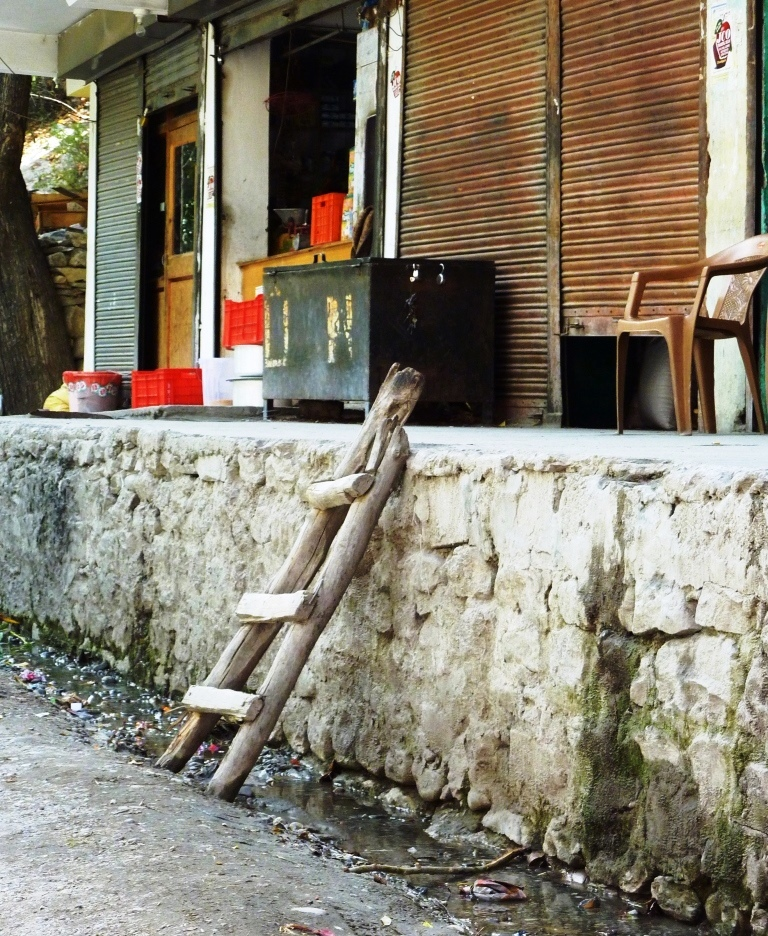
Rough ladder instead of stairs, Nako, HP, India, 2010

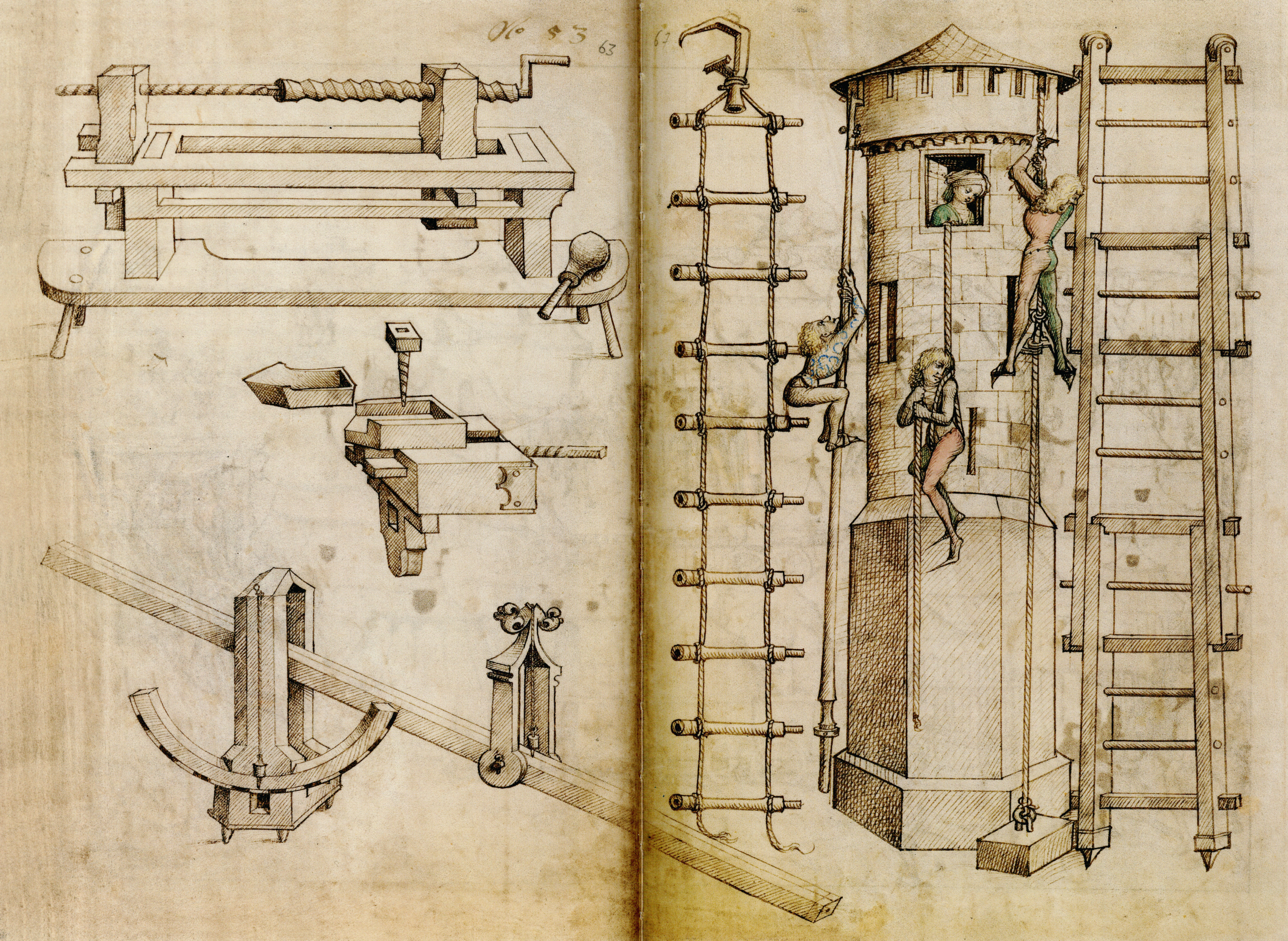
On the right hand page are types of ladders from the end of the 15th century in Germany.

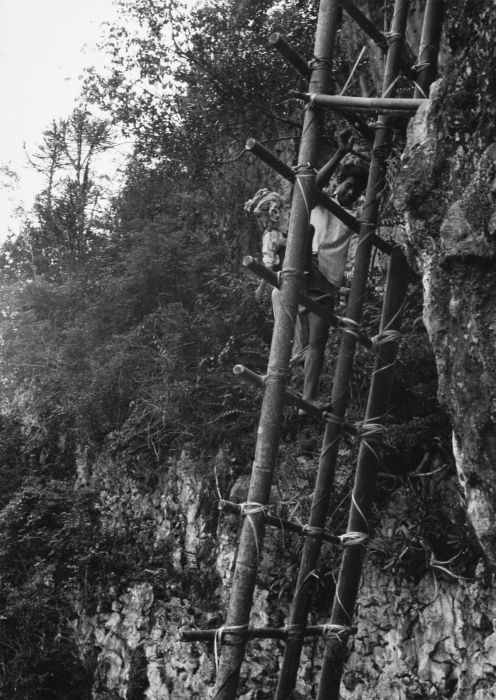
A ladder used for ceremonial purposes in Indonesia

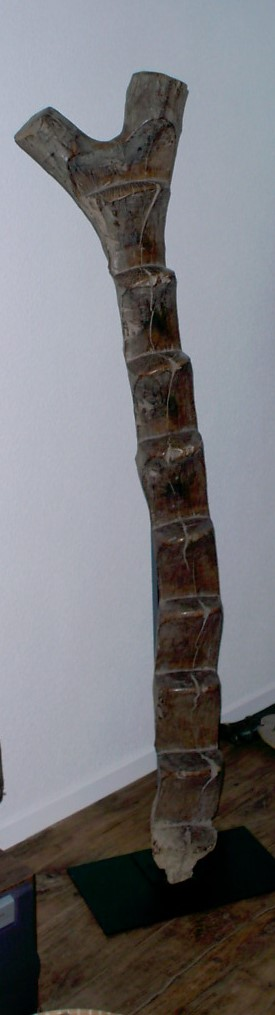
Dogon ladder in Africa

Photo of a dog and pawl on an extension ladder

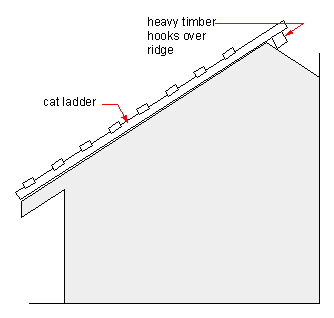
Sketch of Cat Ladder (UK terminology), which aids work on steep roofs

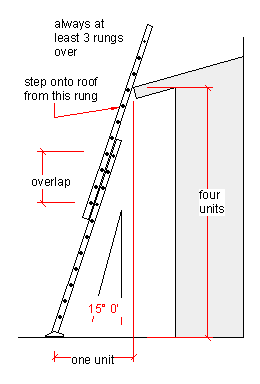
Sketch of double extension ladder

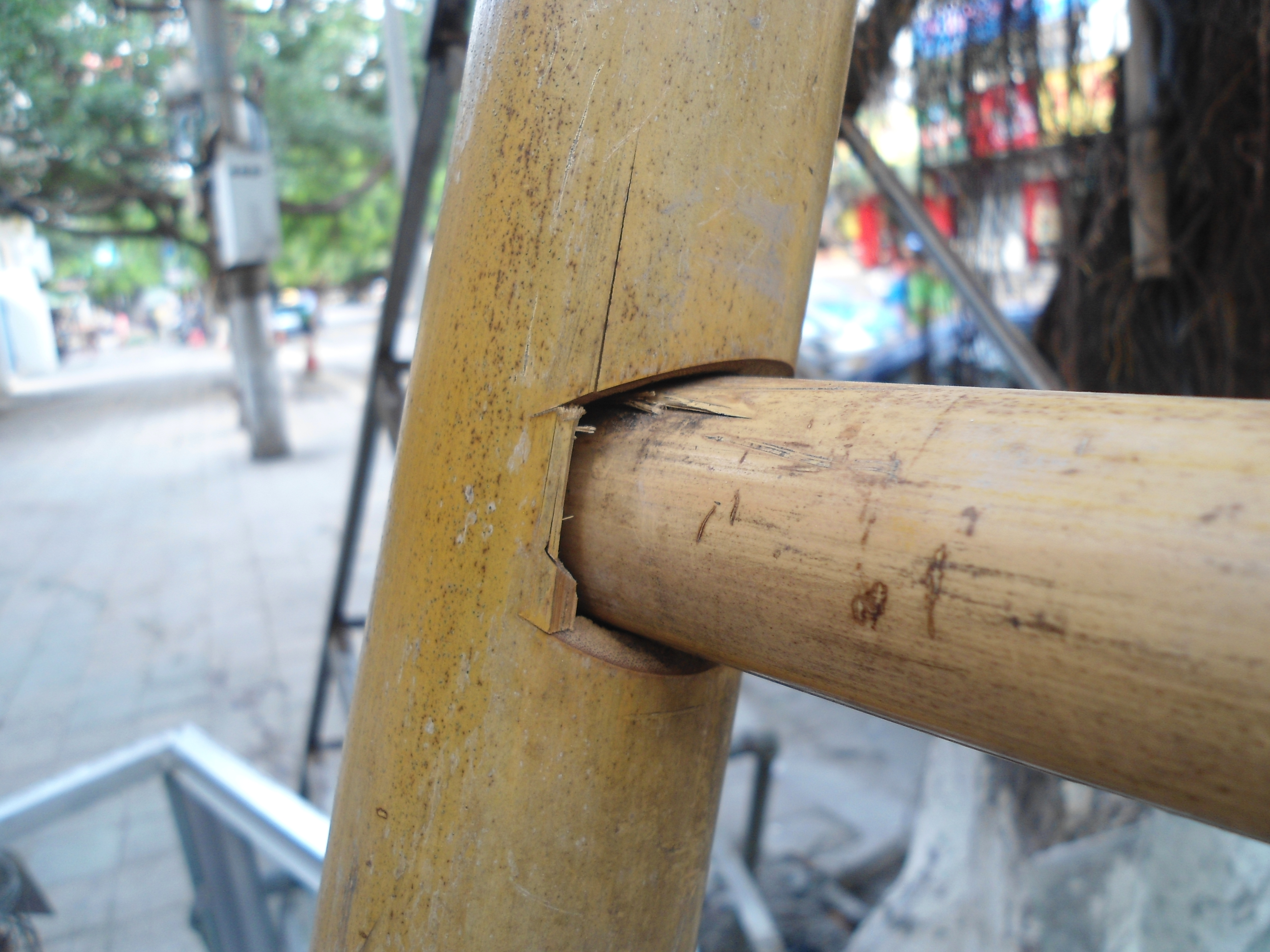
Detail of a bamboo ladder, common in China

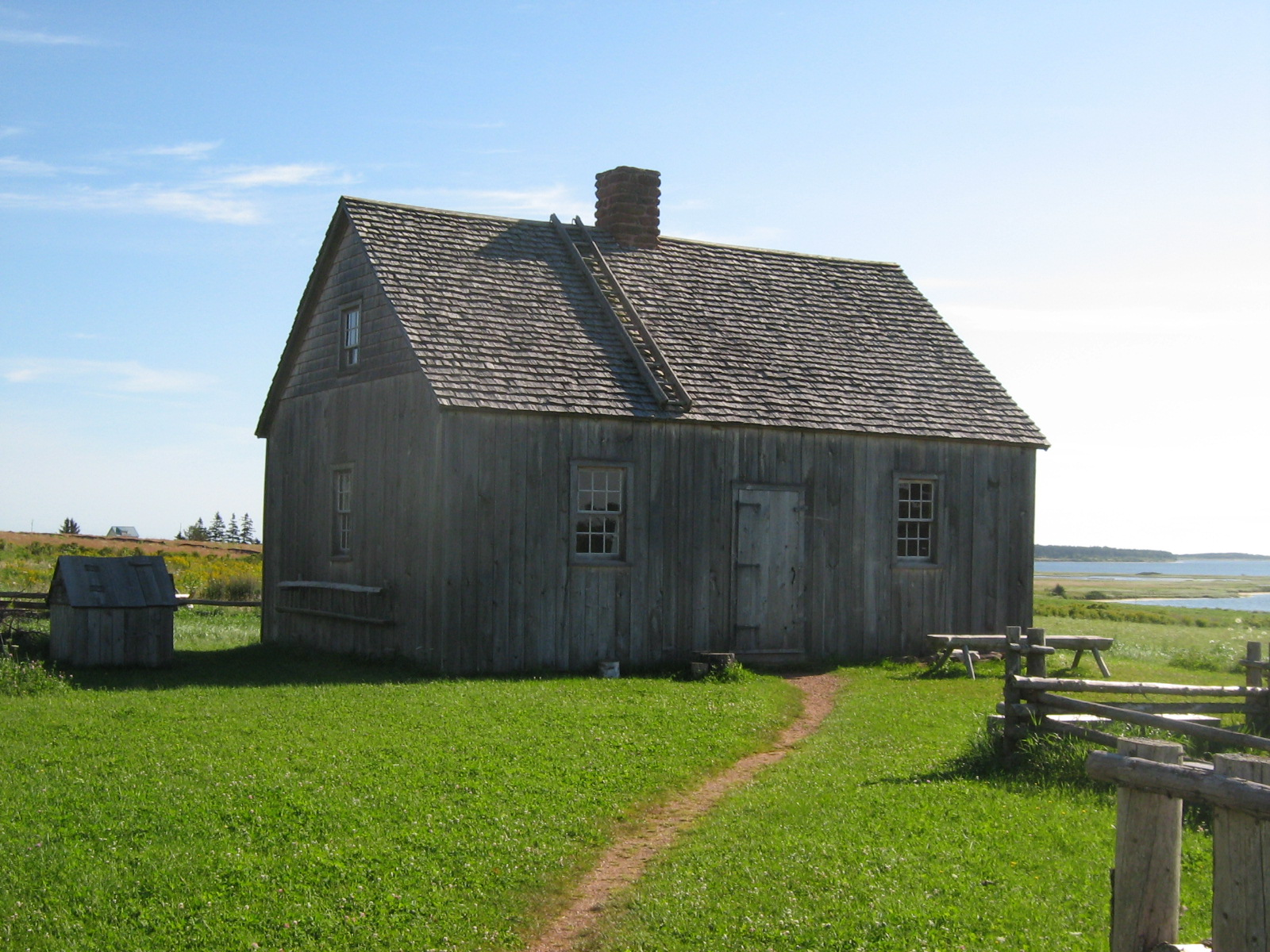
A roof ladder, held in place by hooks extending over the ridge

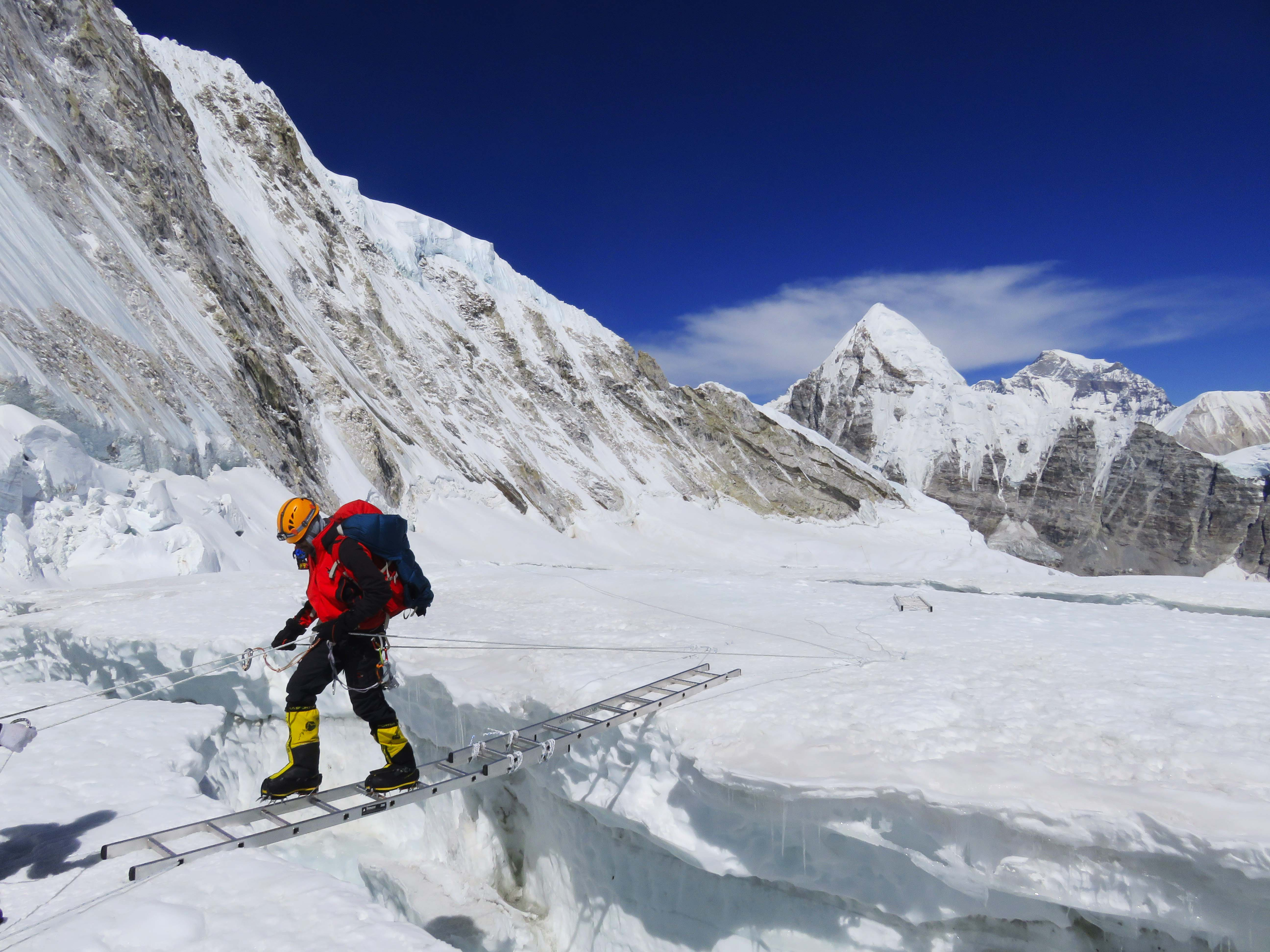
Lightweight aluminum ladder used in the Khumbu Icefall

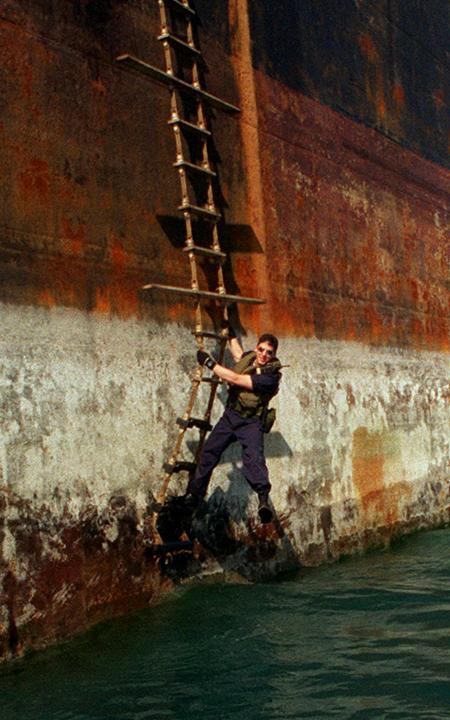
A sailor on a pilot ladder, a type of rope ladder

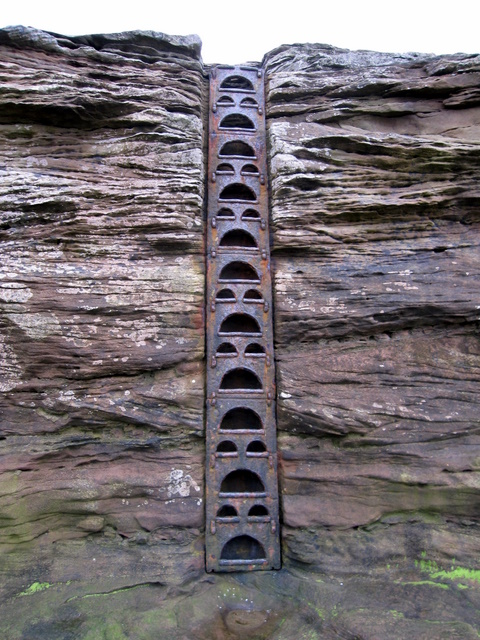
Iron ladder on Hilbre Island, England

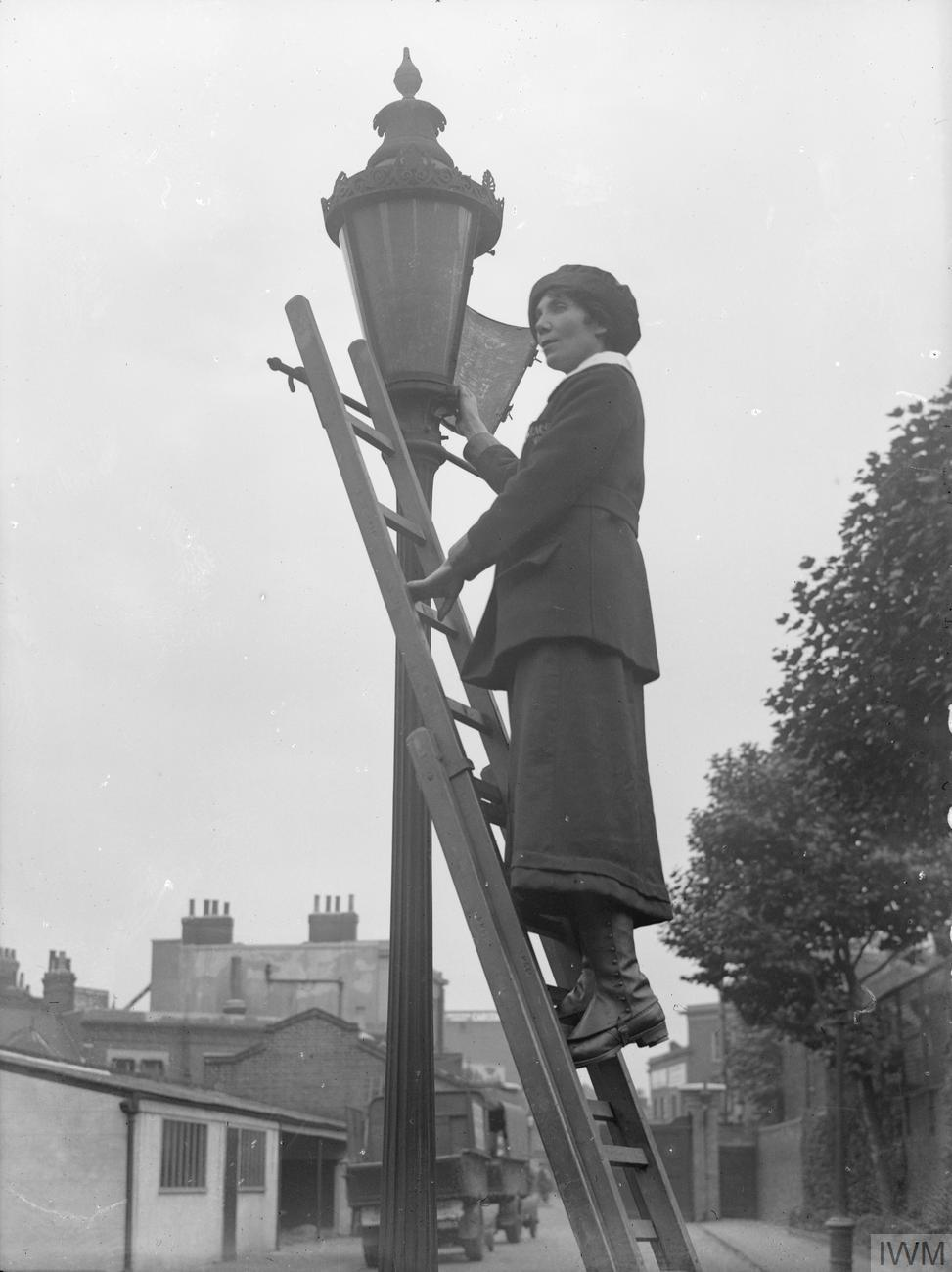
A lamplighter using an extension ladder to clean a street lamp

== See also ==
- ANSI (American National Standards Institute)
- Escalade – Using ladders to scale defensive walls
- John H. Balsley (inventor of a folding wooden stepladder with flat steps)
- Joseph Winters (inventor of a wagon-mounted fire escape ladder)
- List of tools and equipment
- Stairway – Room where stairs are located
