= Mobile safety steps =

Set of steps on wheels or casters

Mobile safety steps

Mobile safety steps, sometimes called warehouse steps, are mobile structures with steps up to a platform. The steps use wheels or casters, making them easy to move. They have the advantage over standard ladders in that the operative can have one hand free when moving up and down the steps and both hands free if there is a top-level platform.

== Variations ==
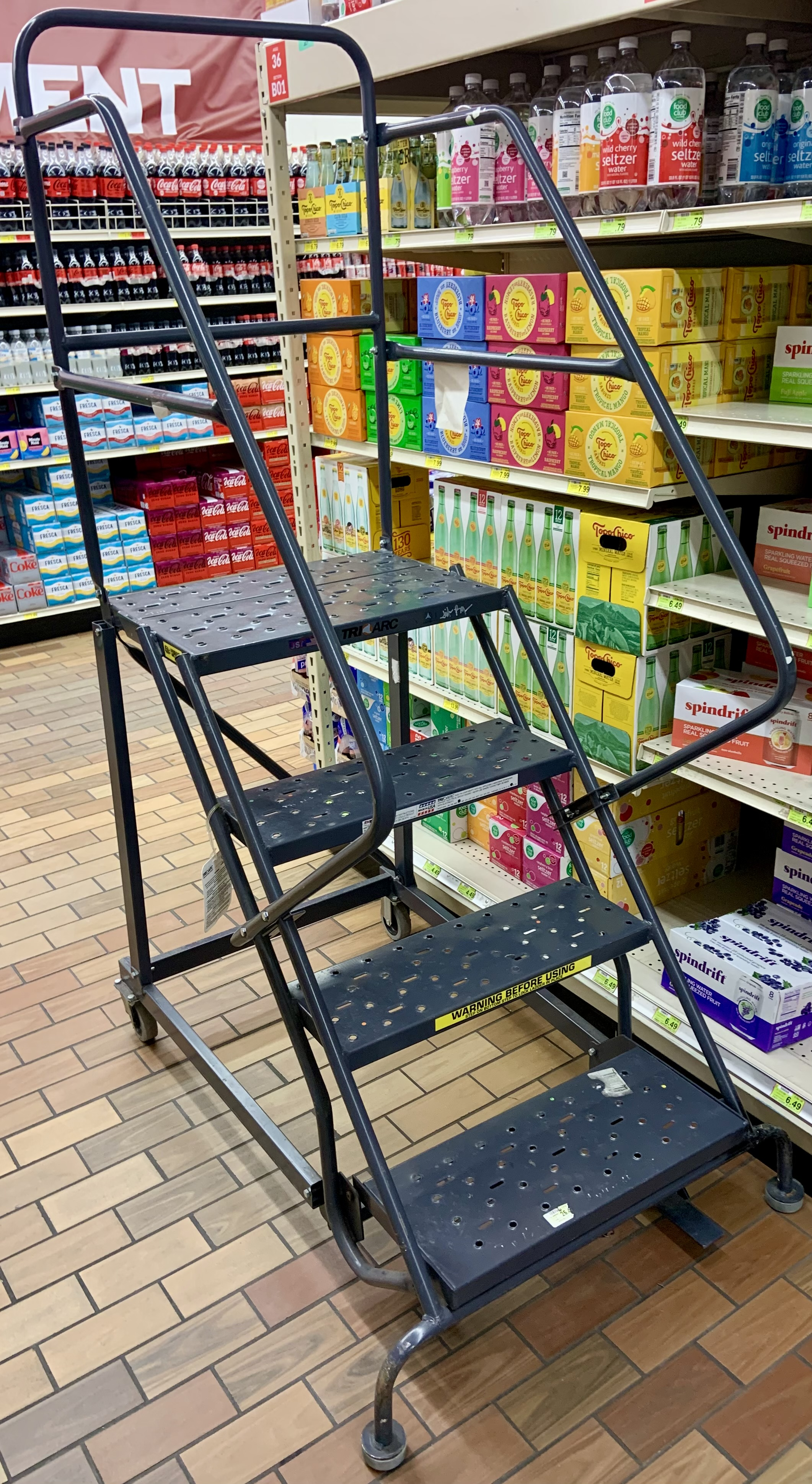
Mobile safety steps at a grocery store

On smaller steps (between 2 and 6 steps) there will be a handrail and castors which retract when weight is applied, making them stable. They are often used in schools, offices, hospitals, stores and libraries.

If they are between 4 and 15 steps they will often be configured to have a top platform (on what would be the final step), and will have surrounding handrails – this style of safety step can be used at a maximum working height of 5 metres. Because they are very sturdy and easy to move, they have a wide variety of uses – for example, in a warehouse (for safe order picking) DIY Hardware store and various types of factories; they can also be used as aircraft steps.

Single- or double-ended access platforms are another variation of the mobile safety steps. As with standard mobile safety steps, they have wheels which can be secured by a hand-operated lever, but will have a larger platform. This allows for activities like maintenance work on walls, machinery and aircraft. The double-ended platform will have two sets of steps with a platform in between.

== Standards for mobile ladders with a platform ==
Mobile safety steps are generally manufactured from steel and have a painted finish. A new European Standard was published in August 2013 known as EN131-7 that covers mobile ladders with a platform commonly known in the UK as Mobile Safety Steps. The UK preparation of the new standard is entrusted to the B/512 technical committee that currently includes the HSE, Trading Standards and the Ladder Association, who are a non-profit trade body representing the UK industry on the safe use of ladders and their standards development.

== See also ==
- Handrail
- Ladder
