= Harold Ray Wing =

American businessman (1940-2012)

Harold "Hal" Ray Wing (1940-2012) founded Wing Enterprises in Springville, Utah. Wing Enterprises was established in 1972, originally operating out of Wing's carport. The company's main product is the Little Giant Ladder System. Hal became mayor of Springville in 1997.

In 1986, President Ronald Reagan invited Wing to serve as a representative at the White House Conference of Small Businesses in Washington, D.C.

In 1995, Wing was named one of Ernst & Young's "Entrepreneurs of the Year" in Utah.

== Personal life ==
Wing and his wife Brigitte were parents of eight children, three of whom were adopted. Wing's eldest son, Arthur, is the current president of Wing Enterprises. Another son, Douglas, is executive vice president of the company. Wing died in 2012.
