= Fixed ladder =

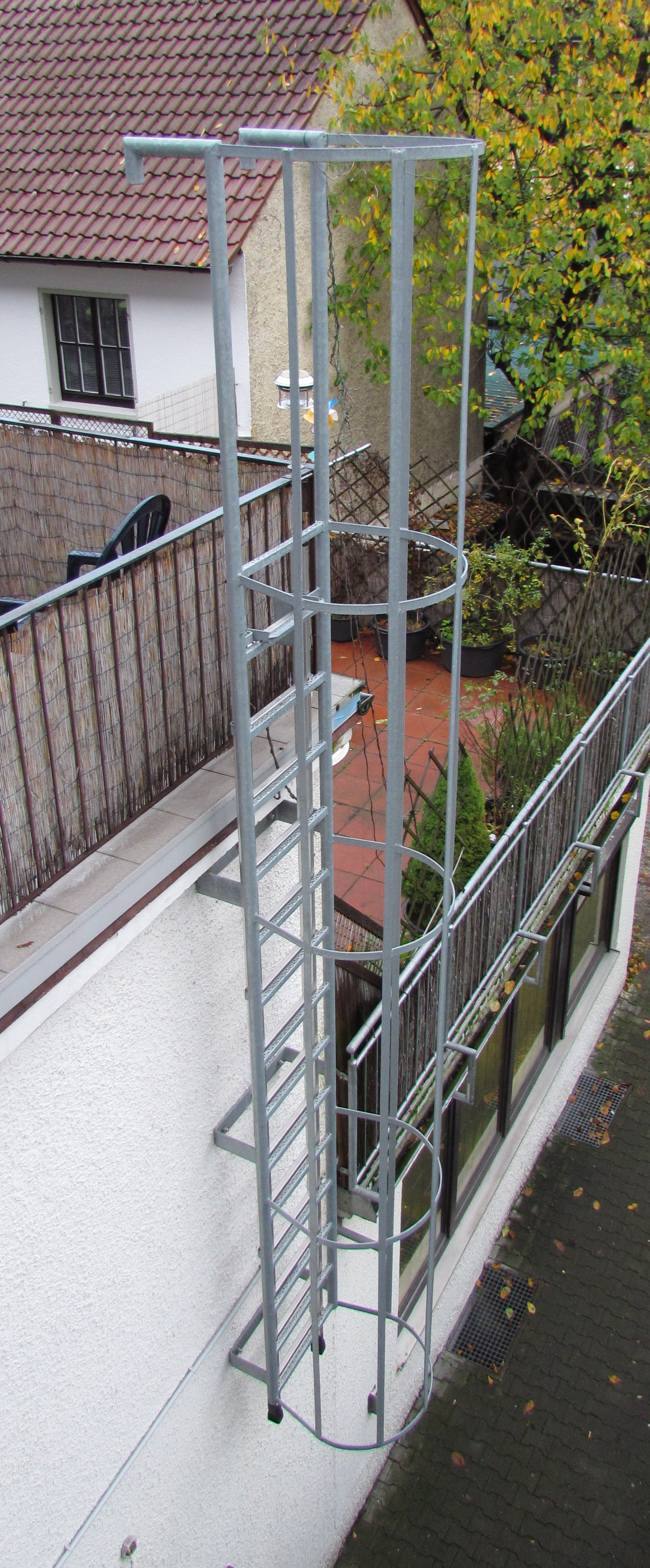

A fixed ladder is a vertical ladder mounted permanently to a structure. These ladders are primarily used to access roofs or other structures for industrial purposes. In the United States, these ladders are covered by OSHA and ANSI standards.

== Components ==
Fixed ladders consist of the following components:

- Rungs: all fixed ladders have rungs, dictated by OSHA Standard 1910.27(b)(1) of no more than 12" (300 mm) on center (measured as the distance from the centerline of a rung to the center line of the next rung), and at 16" (410 mm) clear width.
- Side members: These are the rails on the side of the ladder that are designed that the foot cannot slip off the end. Mostly flat bar or angle profile and sometimes channel.
- Stand-off brackets: Dictated by OSHA Standard 1910.27(c)(4) stand-off brackets must be at least 7" (180 mm) longer than the farthest obstruction for clearance on the back side of ladder. This means that if there is a 4" (100 mm) gutter projecting from the side of a building, a fixed ladder would have to have standoff brackets that were at least 11" (7" + 4") (280 mm) in length.
- Cages: Cages are optional for fixed ladders with a floor to floor elevation of less than 20' (6100 mm). They are often available for ladders with elevation changes down to 11' (3350 mm). Cages are mandated to begin between 7' and 8'(2250 mm) from the ground and extend the entire length of the ladder. Cages can have left hand exits (opening in the LH side of cage), right hand exits (opening in RH side of cage), top exits (for exit through a hatch or floor door), and walk through exits (for exit through back side of fixed ladder). (LH or RH exits are preferred.)
- Fall protection system: Fixed ladders above 24' must have a fall protection system in accordance with OSHA Standard 1910.28(b)(9)(i)(C) . OSHA no longer considers cages to be best practice in preventing falls, and fixed ladders over 24' that are installed or replaced after November 19, 2018, must have a fall protection system based on OSHA's updated requirements.

OSHA and ANSI are only applicable for the US market. Other countries around the world have their own standards which may not be the same.

== Materials ==
Fixed ladders are generally made of sturdy materials such as: aluminum or fiberglass, but can also consist of reinforced polymers, stainless steel, hot dipped galvanized steel, or wood.

- Aluminum: This metal is corrosion-resistant and lightweight, making it a good material for general-purpose fixed ladders.
- Steel: Another sturdy metal, steel is also used for fixed ladders. However, it must be treated to resist corrosion.
- Fiberglass: Lighter than wood but sturdier than aluminum, this material is non-conductive and ideal for use for electrical work.

== See also ==
- Stairway
