= Wing Enterprises =

American ladder manufacturer

- Company type: Private
- Industry: Industrial goods
- Founded: 1970s
- Headquarters: Springville, Utah
- Key people: Harold R. Wing (Founder & CEO); H. Arthur Wing (President); Ryan Moss (CEO)
- Number of employees: 800
- Website: littlegiantladders.com

Wing Enterprises is an American company headquartered in Springville, Utah company, the largest American manufacturer of ladders as of 2005. The company produces the Little Giant Ladder System, a convertible aluminium ladder system. The founder of Wing Enterprises, Harold Ray "Hal" Wing, came across a prototype of the ladder in Germany in the 1970s. He licensed the ladder from the inventor, patented the design in the United States and began manufacturing the ladder in his home and selling it at trade shows.

== Features ==
The ladder itself is capable of being converted into several heights and configurations from a single ladder. Configurations include a straight or extension ladder, an A-frame ladder, a staircase ladder (an uneven A-frame for use on stairs), a 90° ladder, and both sides of a scaffolding trestle achieved through a triple locking hinge. Each of the ladder positions has three heights in one ladder. The ladder can achieve as many as 24 position/height permutations. The ladder folds to a smaller size for storage. The ladder also has "tip-n-glide" wheels to facilitate movement and positioning.

The Ladder features flared legs for increased stability. Locking, telescoping side rails allow the various height configurations. Trapezoidal rungs create a stable standing surface. They are attached using "double zig-zag" welds.

== Models ==
=== Little Giants ===
==== Type I ====
- Industrial heavy duty 250 lbs rated
- Available in Model 17 and Model 22

==== Type IA ====
- Industrial extra heavy duty 300 lbs rated
- Available in Model 13, Model 17, Model 22 and Model 26

==== Type IAA ====
- Industrial special duty 375 lbs rated
- Available in Model 13, Model 17 and Model 22

==== Ultra Step ====
- Industrial extra heavy duty 300 lbs rated
- Available in both aluminium and fibreglass versions
- Adjustable from 5 to 8 feet as a single sided stepladder
- Can be used in the parallel (or 90 degree) position against a wall

=== Industrial Little Giants ===
==== SkyScraper ====
- Industrial extra heavy duty 300 lbs rated
- Available in Model 15 (adjustable 8 to 15 feet), Model 17 (adjustable 9 to 17 feet), and Model 21 (adjustable 11 to 21 feet)

==== Little Giant Fibreglass ====
- Industrial extra heavy duty 300 lbs rated
- Made from a special high-quality non-conductive resin
- Available in Model 17 and Model 22

=== Little Jumbo ===
==== Safety Step ====
- Available in two-step, three-step and four-step models
- Made from rugged, corrosion-resistant aluminium alloy
- Collapse to 5-inch storage depth
