= Stair nosing =

Protruding edge of a stair

Nosing is a covering over the horizontal, protruding edge of a stair where most foot traffic frequently occurs, installed to protect the underlying stair from wear, to reduce the likelihood of slips and falls, and to act as an accent piece.

== Tread nosing ==
The horizontal projection to the front of a tread where most foot traffic frequently occurs. The nosing is the protrusion beyond the riser when vertical risers are used, or beyond the back of the tread below, when angled risers or no risers are used. Anti-slip strips or nosings may be applied. These stair parts can be manufactured from a variety of materials including aluminium, vinyl, and wood, or as a combination of materials, such as a uPVC insert in an aluminium channel.

== Landing nosing ==
The landing nosing will often travel into the landing area to border the bottom of the balusters. The projection over the landing face will be the same as for the treads in the staircase.

== Nosing projection ==
In timber flights, The nosing traditionally projects forward of the riser, the same distance as the thickness of the tread material.

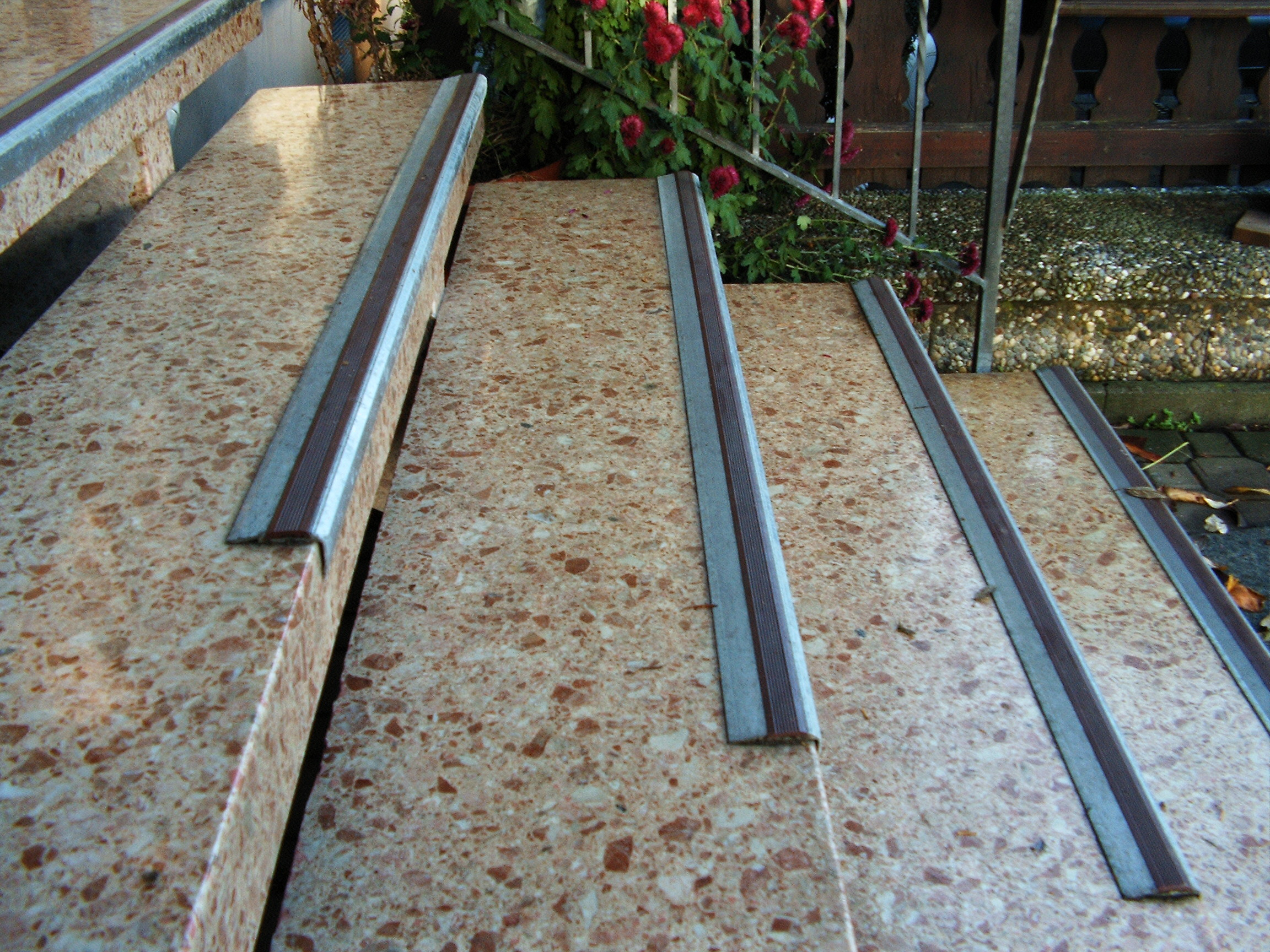

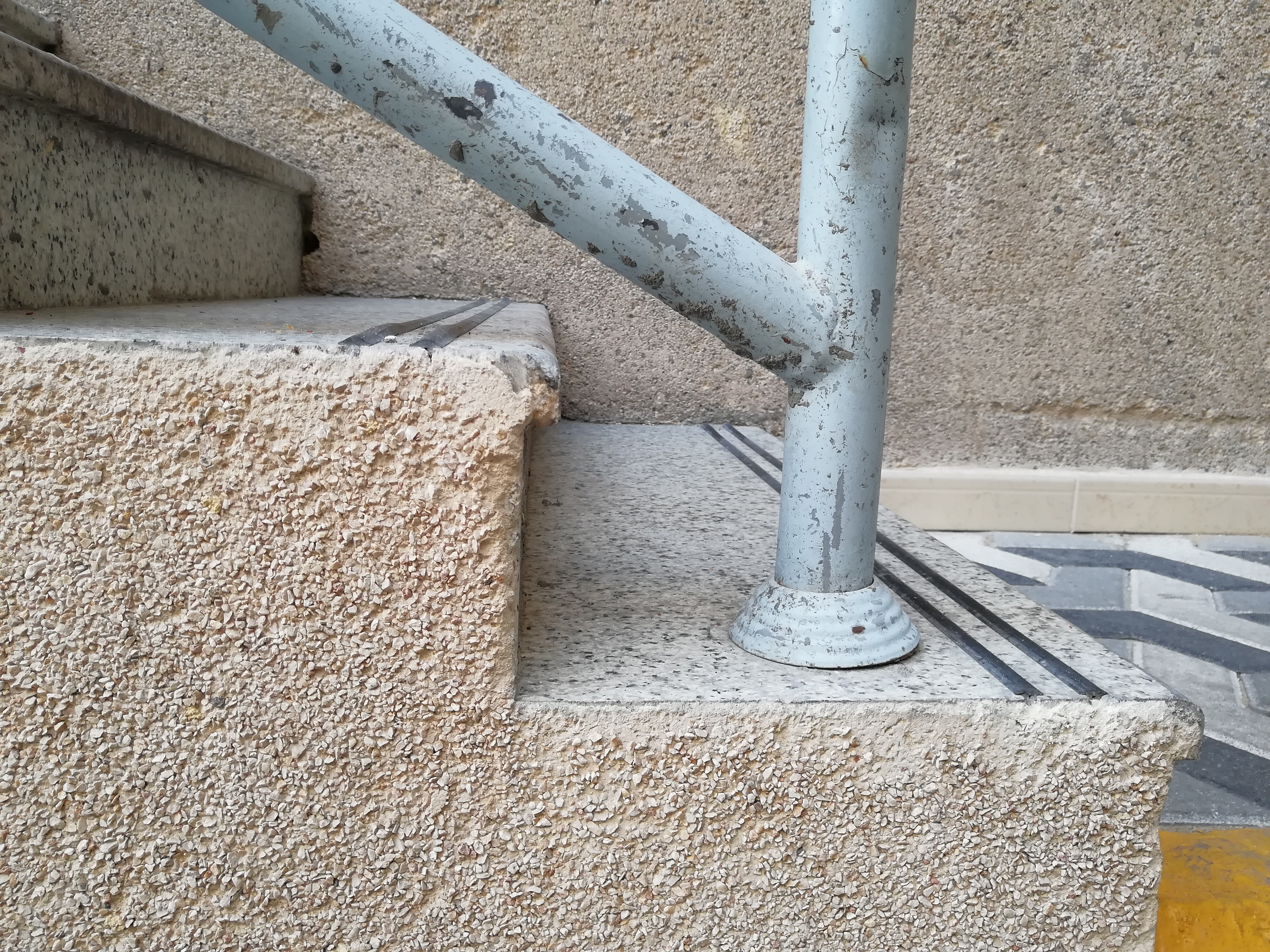
Anti-slip rubber lines and small nose on the edge to broaden the steps

== Safety ==
Stair nosing, especially in commercial and industrial settings, are typically fitted with a non-slip surface to increase traction and prevent injury or even death from slips, trips, and falls. The National Safety Council reports that there are over one million stair-related accidents every year. Installing anti-slip nosing is a proven method of accident prevention.

== California Title 24 Compliance ==
Many states have introduced laws and mandates that require new staircase construction to include an abrasive surface or stair tread to minimize the risk of stairway related incidents. One notable instance of this type of building regulation is 'Title 24, Part 2, Section 2-3326(b)' of the California Energy Commission's "Building Energy Efficiency Program".

The regulation contains a detailed set of rules that must be followed when installing new steps in settings like municipal buildings, industrial plants, schools, etc. Perhaps the most recognizable standard in California's Title 24 building code is the need for a slip-resistant tread or nosing that is of contrasting color from the steps. This regulation affects not only future stair installations, but existing stairs as well. The purpose of this is to increase the discernibility of each step to prevent accidents for those who may be visually-impaired.
