= Hook ladder =

Ladder that can be hooked onto a ledge

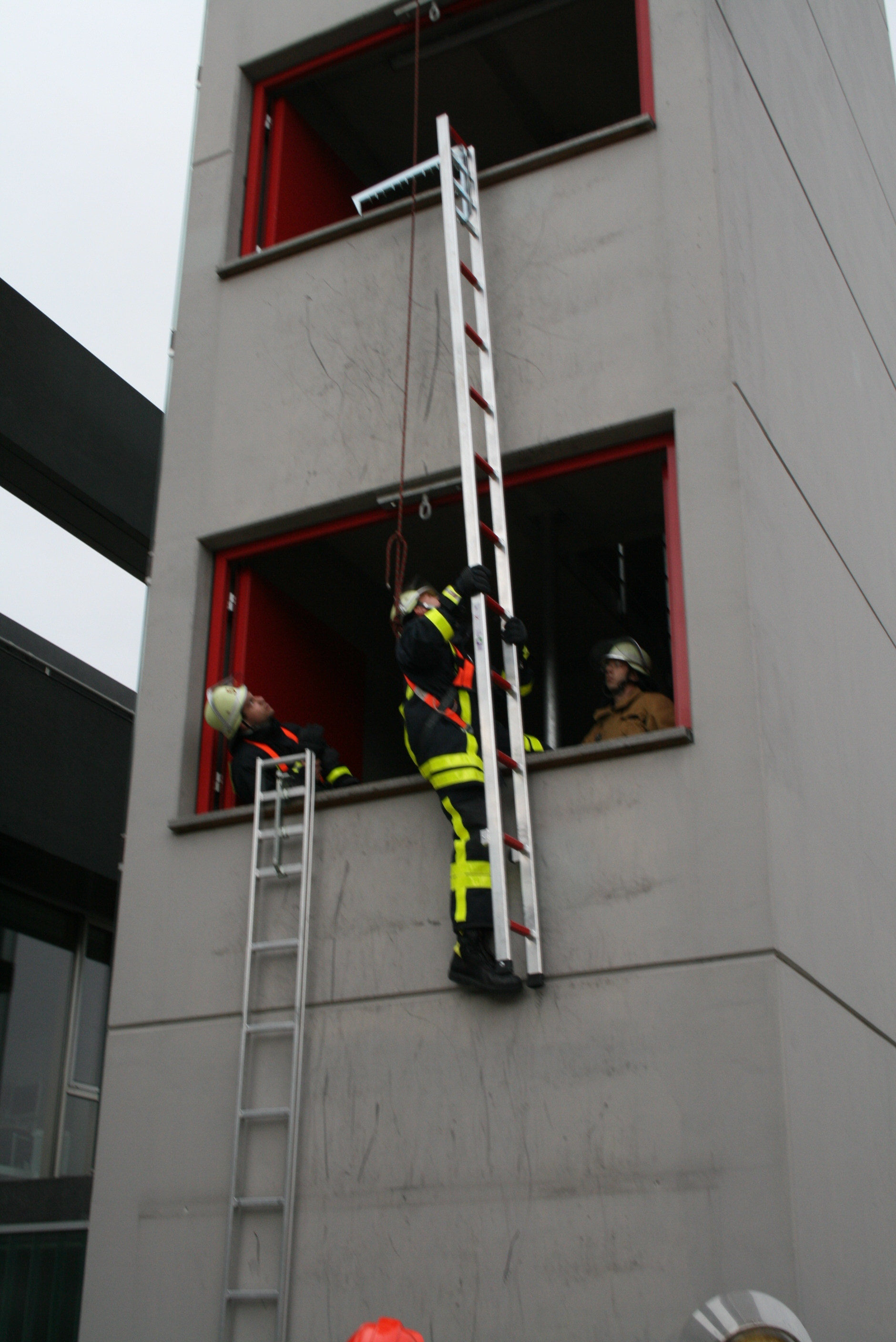
German firefighters using a modern hook ladder

French firefighter using a hook ladder

A hook ladder, also known as a pompier ladder (from the French pompier meaning firefighter), is a type of ladder that can be attached to a window sill or similar ledge by the use of a hooked extending bill with serrations on the underside. The hooked ladder then hangs suspended vertically down the face of the building.

The ladder was developed to access buildings via enclosed alleys, lightwells and yards to which other types of ladder could not be taken. A pair of men and two ladders could be used to scale a building to considerable heights, by climbing from floor to floor and taking the ladders up behind and pitching to the next floor.

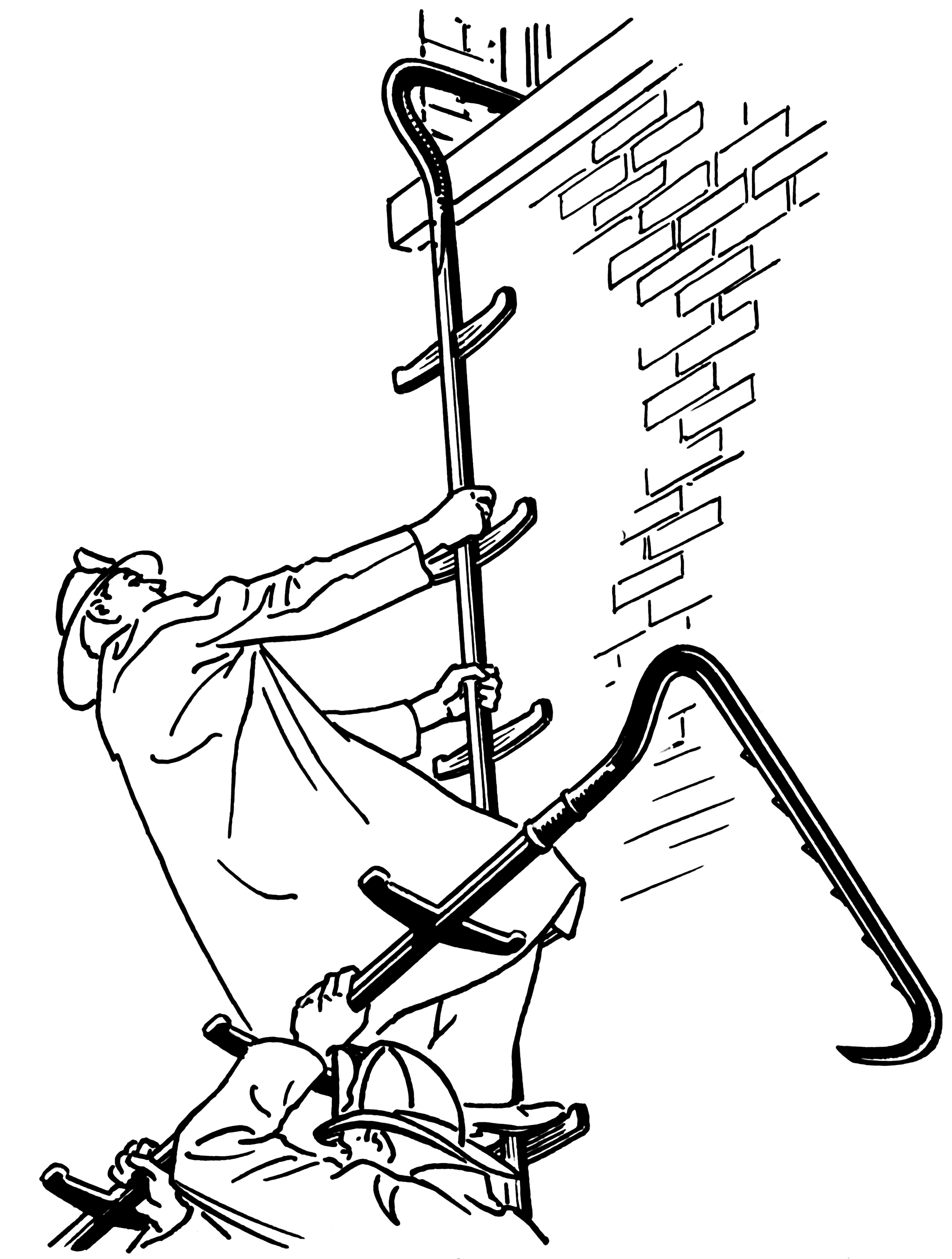
Historical French design

The original French design was a single beam ladder with pairs of rungs projected outward on both sides of the beam. The British version was a conventional two-string ash ladder around 4 metres (13 ft) long and 25 centimetres (10 in) wide. Hook ladders can be used to scale from floor to floor on multi-storey buildings by way of exterior windows. The ladders hook onto the window ledge by a "gooseneck" projecting from the top. Lengths vary from 3 to 5 metres (10 to 16 ft).

== See also ==
- Glossary of firefighting terms
- Escape ladder
