= Glossary of woodworking =

This glossary of woodworking lists a number of specialized terms and concepts used in woodworking, carpentry, and related disciplines.

== A ==
applied carving
A background which is worked separately and then applied, rather than being worked in place.
architrave
An ornamental moulding around a door or window frame, covering the joint between the frame and plaster.
arris
A sharp edge between two faces.
awl
See bradawl and scratch awl.

== B ==
backsaw
A hand saw that has a steel reinforced spine to add rigidity and strength to the saw plate. Typically used in a miter (mitre) box, this saw is used for cross cuts.
bandsaw
A powered saw which utilizes a band of steel that has been joined at the ends to create a loop and has teeth cut into one edge. The workpiece is placed on a small table through which the blade runs and is pushed into the blade in order to make a cut. Bandsaws can be used to make every type of cut in woodworking.
batten
A strip of solid material, historically of wood, used for various construction purposes, including providing the fixing point for roofing or siding materials such as shingles or tiles.
bead
A typically rounded or semicircular decorative treatment cut into a square edge of a moulding or a piece of wooden furniture.
belly
Convexity in a jointed board surface.
bench dog

A peg standing proud of the bench surface.
bench hook
A tool clamped to a workbench and used for easy cutting.
bevel

An edge of a structure that is not perpendicular to the faces of the piece, e.g. by being cut on a diagonal, typically in order to soften a sharp edge for the sake of safety, wear resistance, or aesthetics, or to facilitate mating with another piece. The term is often used interchangeably with chamfer, though there are sometimes distinctions in technical usage.
billet
1. A short piece of a log, especially one used for fuel.
2. A split-out piece of a bolt of wood.
blind
Joinery with mating surfaces not protruding through the face or end grain of the pieces being joined. An example is a "blind" mortise and tenon joint.
bolster

1. A shoulder.
2. A timber situated between a post and a beam to increase the bearing or shorten the span.
bolt
A piece of log cut to a specific length, usually a short length from which products such as shingles are split or cut. Sometimes also called a billet or round.
bow saw

brace
A hand tool used to drill holes, having a knobbed handle on the top to which pressure is applied and a U-shaped grip in the middle which is used to rotate the drill bit.
bucksaw
burl

A knotty, often rounded outgrowth on a tree, in which the grain has grown in a deformed and convoluted manner.
burnisher

A hand tool used for creating a burr on a card scraper.
butterfly joint

== C ==
cannel

The concavity of a gouge blade.
carcass
The frame or main parts of an unfinished workpiece before they are completed with coverings.
card scraper
A flat blade with a burred edge used for smoothing.
carpentry
caul
A strip or block of wood used to distribute or direct clamping force. See batten.
chainsaw
chamfer
chatoyance
The effect seen in dramatic wood grain direction changes, as in flame figured maple.
chip carving
An incised surface decoration, usually geometric.
chisel
Any tool with a characteristically shaped cutting edge used for carving or cutting a hard material such as wood, stone, or metal by hand, with a mallet, or with mechanical power. Chiselling involves forcing the blade or cutting edge into the material in order to cut it.
chop saw
chops
A type of vise.
circular saw
clamp

Any fastening device used to hold or secure pieces tightly together to prevent movement or separation through the application of inward pressure. Some types of clamps are temporary, used to position components while fixing them together; others are intended to be permanent.
climb cut
On a table saw or router, cutting against the normal feed direction at the end of the cut to prevent tearout.
close grain
Any wood grain with very fine fibers of cells that are not visibly porous.
compass saw
conversion
The reduction of a whole log into pieces suitable for working. Conversion can be done in three basic ways: sawn, hewn, or split.
coping saw
crook
Longitudinal bending to one side, caused by uneven seasoning or grain. See wood warping.
crotch
The section of a tree where a branch divides from the trunk, or the trunk divides in two; typically an area of convoluted grain.
crossgrain
Working perpendicular to the wood grain.
crosscut
A cut made perpendicular to the wood grain.
crown of thorns
A system of self-supporting and interlocking pieces.
cruck
A pair of crooked, structural timbers in a timber frame building. Crucks act as both posts and rafters like an A-frame.
cup
Transverse bending, convex or concave, usually predictable, considering grain orientation. See wood warping.

== D ==
dado
A slot made across the grain. Typically, the slot is made by milling, chiseled, or sawed.
doatiness
A disease of timber that gives a spotted or speckled appearance to the wood.
dovetail joint
A joint technique most commonly used in woodworking joinery. Noted for its resistance to being pulled apart (tensile strength), the dovetail joint is commonly used to join the sides of a drawer to the front.
dowel
A cylindrical piece of wood used as a pin for securing a joint.
drawknife
A cutting tool with two handles used for cutting large chamfers.
drill
1. (v.) The process of making holes in a material.
2. (n.) Any tool used for drilling holes, such as a chisel used in combination with a mallet.
dry rot
Decay in timber caused by fungal growth, usually in a moist, stagnant, poorly ventilated atmosphere.
dust collection
A system used to capture wood dust from woodworking machines such as a table saw, miter saw, router, planer, or jointer. A shop vacuum or a dust collector captures wood dust using a high volume of air flow.

== E ==
engineered wood

== F ==
face
1. The wider side of a board or other piece of wood with sides of unequal sizes; the narrower side is referred to as the edge.
2. The side that is meant to be visible in the finished item.
fence
A flat and straight length of some material, usually wood, steel or aluminium, which provides a reference for tools to work against, or which prevents the work from sliding.
fiber

The fine tube-like structure of wood which is hollow and determines the grain direction.
figure
Naturally occurring decorative patterns in wood, caused either by growth increments or tissue orientation.
finger joint

finishing
firmer
A strong chisel for general work or mortising; may have square sides or bevels on both sides.
fishtail chisel

A chisel or gouge with a splayed end.
flat gouge
A gouge with minimal curvature used for finishing and smoothing.
flitch
A rough-cut board in which the round of the tree trunk is still visible.
float
A type of flat, tapered, single-cut file used to cut, flatten, and smooth (or "float") wood surfaces by abrasion, e.g. when making a wooden plane. Unlike rasps and files, floats have parallel teeth and can be resharpened as many times as the thickness of the blade will allow.
flute
1. A deep channel cut in wood.
2. The cannel of a gouge.
foxing
A yellow-brown discoloration of wood caused by fungal infection.
frame and panel

frame saw

French cleat
A molding used to hang cabinets.
fretsaw
A type of saw with a very fine-toothed blade used for delicate cuts in thin material.
frosting
Regular indented patterns created with a special-purpose punch called a froster.

== G ==
gimlet
A hand tool for drilling small holes in wood without splitting, typically a semi-cylindrical piece of steel that is hollow on one side, having a cross handle at one end and a worm or screw at the other.
gouge
A chisel-like tool with a curved cutting edge.
grain
The longitudinal fibers in wood.
green wood
Unseasoned wood or freshly harvested timber, usually with a high moisture content.
grit
The grade of particles in sandpaper or sharpening stones which determines the aggressiveness of the cut.
groove
A slot or channel made with the grain, usually on the end-grain in preparation for a tongue and groove joint.
grooving
A rectangular sinking in the surface of any material.

== H ==
hand plane
See plane.
hand saw

hardwood
Wood from an angiosperm tree, i.e. a tree in the division Magnoliophyta that bears flowers and fruits. Despite the name, hardwood is not necessarily hard or dense (e.g. balsa is a hardwood), although it is generally harder than most softwoods.
heart shake
A shake (i.e. crack or split) radiating out from the heartwood.
heel
The corner of a chisel, knife, or gouge bevel which meets the back of the blade and polishes the cut.
holdfast

A hold-down iron fitting into a hole in a bench and tightened or loosened by hammer taps.
hollow grind
A concave bevel on a chisel, gouge, or knife.

== I ==
incannel
The concave surface of a gouge, or a gouge sharpened on the concave surface.
interlocked grain
A type of wood grain which has multiple longitudinal directions in alternating layers, typical of many tropical hardwoods, and very difficult to work and to produce smooth surfaces.

== J ==
jamb
Janka hardness test
jigsaw
A type of saw that can form circular cuts by moving the workpiece past a blade which moves rapidly up and down.
joiner
A woodworker who does finer work than a framing carpenter.
joinery
The part of woodworking that involves joining individual pieces of wood to produce more complex items; the art of framing, joining, dressing, and fixing the finishings of a building.
joint
The connection between two pieces of timber.
jointer

1. A power plane used to straighten boards and square edges.
2. An intermediate-length hand plane; a jointer plane.
joist

== K ==
kerf
The gap left when material is removed by a saw cut. The width of the kerf is equal to the set of the saw.
keyhole saw
knee
knot
A circular pattern in timber caused by a dead branch that was not fully integrated into the tree before it was cut down. A loose knot is one that cannot be relied upon to remain in place in the piece. A tight knot, on the other hand, is fixed by growth or position in the wood structure so that it firmly retains its place in the surrounding wood even after working.

== L ==
lap joint

lead
The tendency for wood that is being cut to direct the saw parallel to its grain.
lath

A thin, narrow strip of straight-grained wood, typically arranged side-by-side with others and used to support roof shingles or tiles, as a backing material for plaster or stucco in walls and ceilings, or in lattice and trellis frameworks.
LathArt
A type of folk art that uses lath from old lath and plaster walls.
lathe
lumber

== M ==
mandrel

marquetry
moulding

A strip of material with various profiles used to cover transitions between surfaces or for decoration.
moulding plane

mortise

A cavity or hole, generally rectangular, in a piece of wood, meant to receive a tenon or a hinge.
mitre

Any joint made by fastening together pieces with the ends cut at an angle.
mitre box

A box used for making mitre joints by having slots to guide a saw at the desired angle for the joint.
mitre saw

== N ==
nosing
The rounded edge to a flat face or other surface.

== P ==
panel saw
See hand saw.
plane

1. (v.) The process of removing material from an object in thin shavings in order to make it flat.
2. (n.) Any tool used for planing.
plane iron
The cutting part of a hand plane.
planer

A machine used to reduce the thickness of boards.
plank
Any piece of timber that is flat, elongated, and rectangular with parallel faces that are higher and longer than they are wide.

== Q ==
quarter-sawn
A plank with tree growth rings perpendicular to the wider face. See wood grain.

== R ==
rabbet (American English)

A recess or groove cut parallel to, and at the edge of, a board.
rail
A horizontal member of a frame on a door, window or panel. Contrast stile.
rail and stile
See frame and panel.
rasp
A long and flat steel tool with raised teeth for shaping wood.
reed
A series of beads arranged in a row.
relief cut
A short, straight cut made at a right angle to a curved layout so that sharper-than-normal curves can be cut with a jig saw or band saw.
riffler
A paddle-shaped rasp.
rift sawn
Rip-sawing of lumber perpendicular to the grain, often confused with quarter-sawn.
ring shake
A natural type of split (shake) occurring between the annual growth rings.
rip
Any cut made parallel to the grain.
rip saw
route

To cut a channel or groove.
router

== S ==
S2S
A type of lumber, usually furniture-grade hardwood, with two sides planed.
sanding
sandpaper
saw
saw rasp
A rasp with saw teeth.
scorp
A drawknife with a curved, sometimes completely circular blade, often used for hollowing out objects such as bowls.
scratch awl
A sharp-pointed hand tool used to mark wood for cutting, usually used in joinery or when a more precise mark is needed beyond that provided by a pencil or other method of marking the cut.
scribing

The technique of shaping the end of a moulding or frame component to neatly fit the contours of an abutting member.
scroll saw
A motorized fretsaw.
seasoning
The process of reducing the moisture content of wood before working to prevent cracking, splitting, and other damage often caused by drying.
shake
1. A crack or split in wood caused by damage or drying.
2. A split (as opposed to sawn) shingle.
shim
A slender, usually tapered, piece of material used to temporarily adjust the angle of a joint or support; sometimes used permanently as an easy but unsightly way to, for example, correct the plumb of a freestanding piece of furniture.
shooting
The technique of planing an edge straight or square.
shooting board
shore
A heavy timber used to support a wall.
skew
Out of square or in an oblique position.
slab
1. A partially round cut from a log.
2. Another name for a plank.
slab-cut
A plank with growth rings roughly parallel to the wider face.
slick
A giant chisel used in framing and traditional building construction.
slip
A shaped stone used for sharpening non-flat blades such as gouges.
snib
A wooden toggle used to hold the work on a table.
softwood
Wood from a gymnosperm tree, i.e. trees in the divisions Pinophyta and Ginkgophyta. Despite the name, softwood is not necessarily soft or lightweight (e.g. douglas-fir is a softwood). Contrast hardwood.
spalting
A change in the texture, strength and color of wood caused by colonies of fungus growing within the dead wood. Where colonies of fungus meet, fine black lines, often considered a desirable feature, are visible.
splay
See bevel.
split
To longitudinally separate wood along grain layers.
spokeshave
A tool used to shape and smooth wooden rods and shafts, often for use as wheel spokes and chair legs.
square
1. A tool such as a steel square, try square, or combination square.
2. A right angle.
3. A unit of area equivalent to 100 square feet (9.3 m^{2}).
sticker
A small block of wood used to separate boards that are in the process of drying.
sticking
A type of moulding that is part of a larger piece of wood such as a frame (as opposed to being applied independently).
stile

A vertical member of a frame on a door, window or panel. Contrast rail.
stringer
A timber, usually 2 by 12 inches (5.1 cm × 30.5 cm), that supports the treads and rises in a staircase.
sweep
1. The curvature of a gouge, ranging from very little curvature (but not actually flat else it would be a chisel) to deep or quick.
2. A warping defect in a piece of wood.

== T ==
table saw

A circular saw, mounted on an arbor and driven by an electric motor, that partially protrudes through the top of a table, which is used to support the material being cut.
tear out
Broken or torn fibers resulting from damage as the blade of a tool exits a cut.
tenon
A projection on the end of a piece of wood for insertion into a mortise.
termite barrier
A physical barrier used in construction which blocks subterranean termites from reaching wood.
timber
Another name for lumber, i.e. wood that is newly processed from a forest.
tongue and groove
tread
The part of a stair that is stepped on.
treen
Made entirely of wood, usually referring to small objects like bowls or utensils.
true
Something which is accurately placed, shaped, or sized. To "true up" two pieces of wood is to make them align.
twist
A longitudinal twisting of wood due to uneven seasoning or grain. See wood warping.
two-by-four

A common size of dimensional lumber named for its unprocessed dimensions, usually measuring 1.5 by 3.5 inches (3.8 cm × 8.9 cm) in practice.

== U ==
undercutting
Cutting away from an edge to increase the sense of relief or thinness.

== V ==
veiner
A small, deep gouge.
veneer
Very thin slices of wood used for inlay or to cover surfaces.
veneer saw
A specialty tool used for trimming veneer.
vise

A mechanical apparatus with two parallel jaws, one fixed and the other movable, used to secure an object to allow work to be performed on it.

== W ==
wane
An edge of a sawn board where the bark or surface of the trunk remains.
warp
A distortion in a piece of lumber, such as a twist, cup or bow.
warping
waste
Wood that will be removed in the finished work. It is often retained during working as a handle to conveniently hold and manipulate the portion being worked.
wasting
Quickly removing wood during carving, usually with an adze, knife, or rasp.
wood
A porous and fibrous structural tissue found in the stems and roots of trees and woody plants. Wood is an organic material consisting of a natural composite of cellulose fibers that are strong in tension embedded in a matrix of lignin that resists compression.
wood carving
wood glue
woodturning
woodworking
The activity or skill of making items from wood. It includes many categories and sub-disciplines, such as cabinetry and furniture making, wood carving, joinery, carpentry, and woodturning.
