= Plunge saw =

Type of handheld circular saw

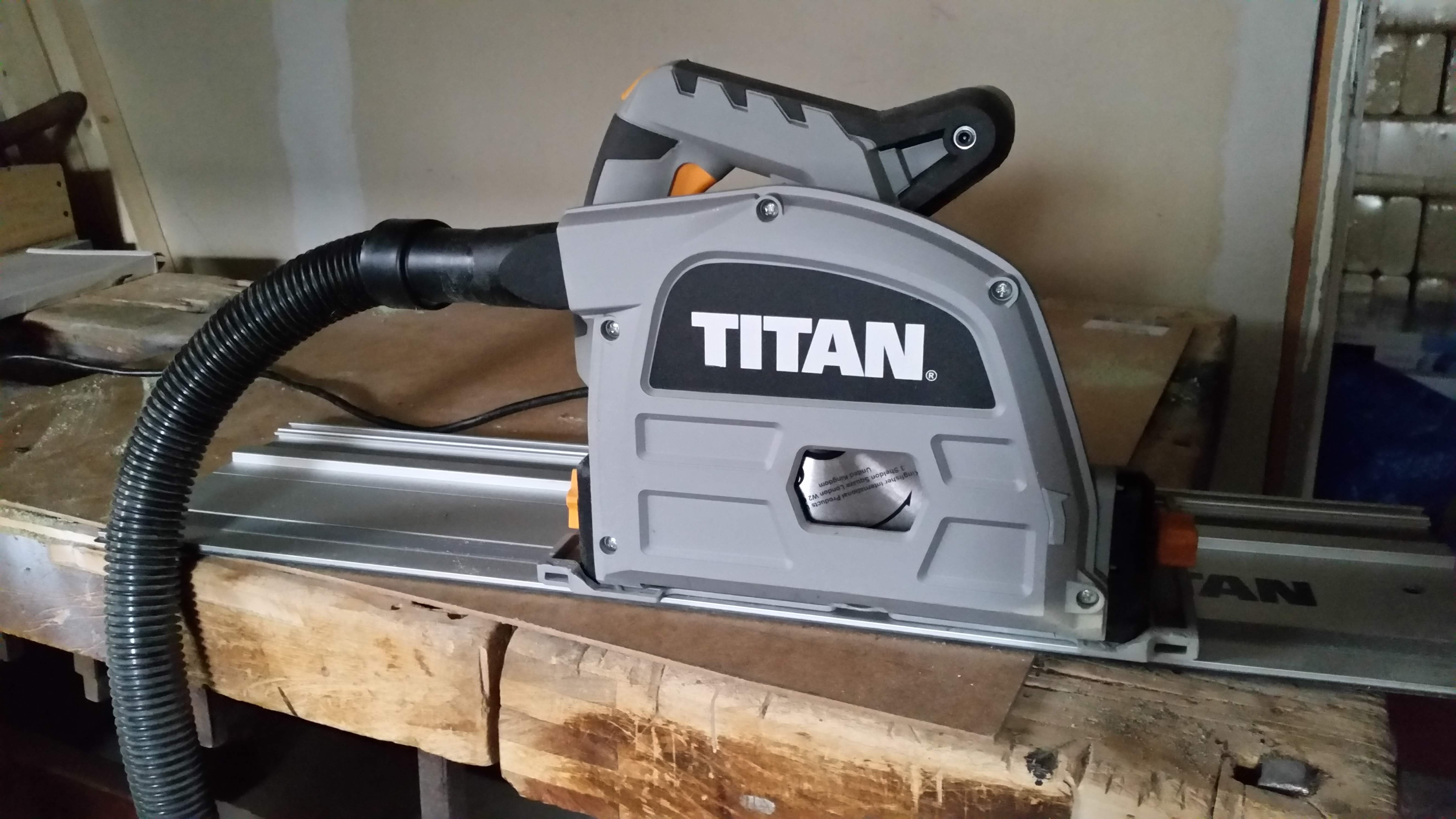
Plunge saw mounted on a guide rail (track) and attached to a dust extraction system.

A plunge saw or plunge-cut saw is a type of hand-held circular saw which differs from a regular circular saw in that it can plunge into the material to a predetermined depth during the cut. In other words, the depth-of-cut is not fixed and often can be adjusted to be just slightly over the thickness of the board being cut. This property also allows a plunge saw to cut shallow grooves into the workpiece, if necessary. Compared to traditional hand-held circular saws, plunge saws are said to increase operator safety, as well as allowing for reduced splintering and tear-out. Plunge saws are a useful power tool for joiners, carpenters, kitchen fitters and anyone who works with laminates, insulation or needs to make many cuts in work pieces.

== History ==
The German power tool manufacturer Festool introduced the first guide rail in 1962, and patented and released the first plunge-cut saw in 1980.

== Rail systems ==
A track is used to guide the plunge saw.

=== Compatibility ===
The original FS track system of Festool is also used by many other manufacturers, such as Makita and Milwaukee, which means that tracks, saw and other equipment can be used across different manufacturers. An alternative standard which is not compatible with the Festool system is the FSN system from Bosch, which is also used by Mafell. There is some debate as to which of the rail systems is the best, and both have their supporters, but their functional differences are small in practice.

=== Lengths and connection ===
Rails are available in different lengths, and should be robust and rigid. A shorter rail (for example 80 cm) can be handy for smaller work, while lengths such as 140 cm, 210 cm or 310 cm can be useful for sawing larger boards. Multiple rails can often be joined with extension pieces to achieve a longer length. If a shorter rail of a particular length is needed one can modify an existing rail by cutting it.

=== Stability ===
The underside of the rail is often finished with a non-slip material, while the upper side can have smooth plastic finish. A clamp can be used to fix the rail if more fixation is needed. When using a rail for the first time, the rubber strip on the side used for sighting must be cut to fit.

=== Other uses ===
Some rails can also be used for jigsaws and handheld routers by using an adapter, and some of these adapters can be used on multiple rail systems (Festool and Bosch).

== Compared with other track saws ==
Plunge saws usually come with a track system which lets them slide on a guide rail during operation, allowing the operator to perform long and accurate cuts, and for this reason plunge saws are sometimes called "track saws". However, the term track saw can be ambiguous, since some normal handheld circular saws without a plunge-cut feature also can be fitted with a track or guide rail. Compared to a conventional circular saw, a plunge saw can be safer and more precise tool for woodworking and carpentry.

== See also ==
- Wall chaser
