= Miter box =

Woodworking tool used to guide a saw

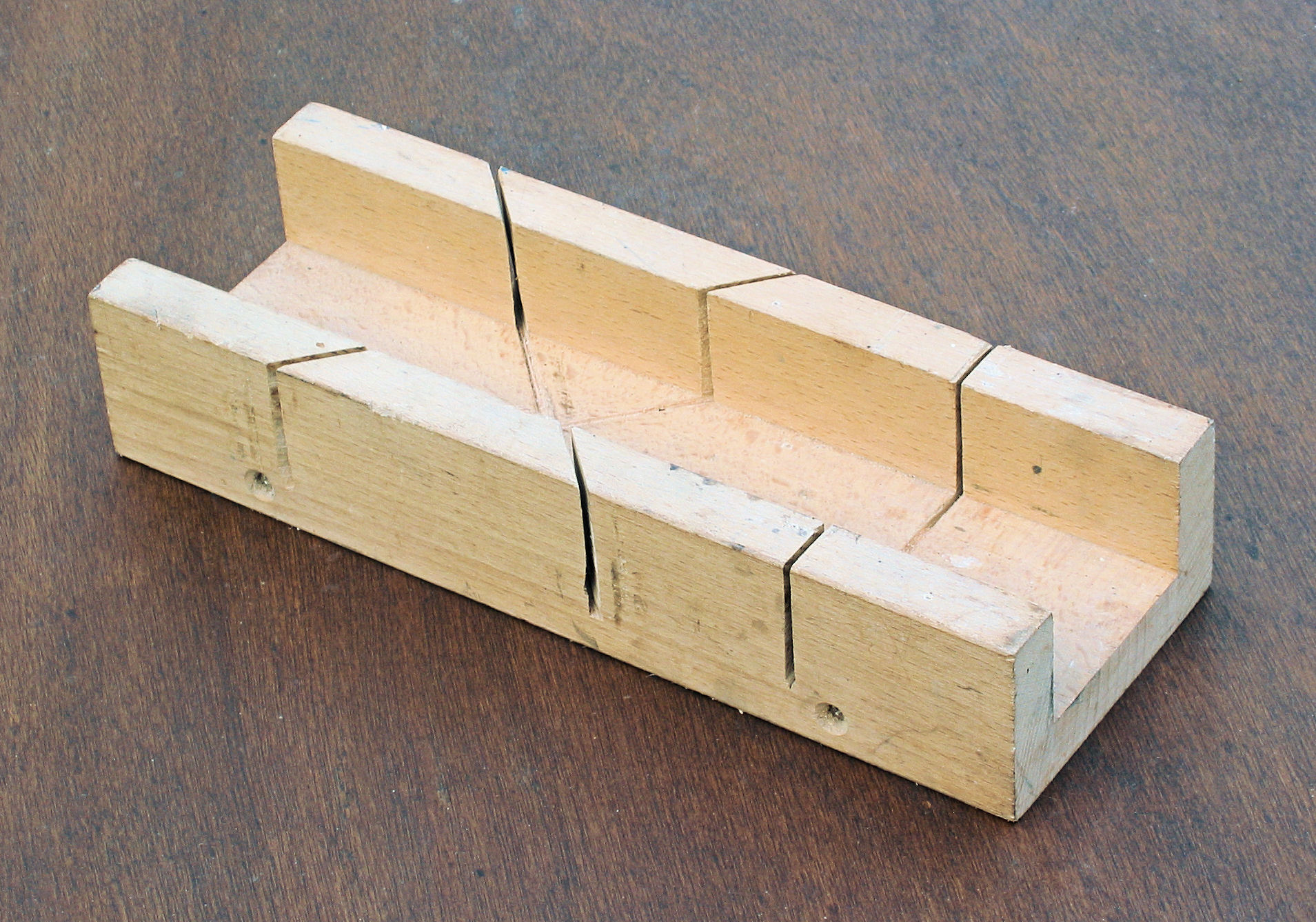
- A simple wooden miter box for cutting 45° and 90° angles
- Other names: Miter box
- Classification: Woodworking appliance
- Used with: A backsaw
- Related: Powered miter saw

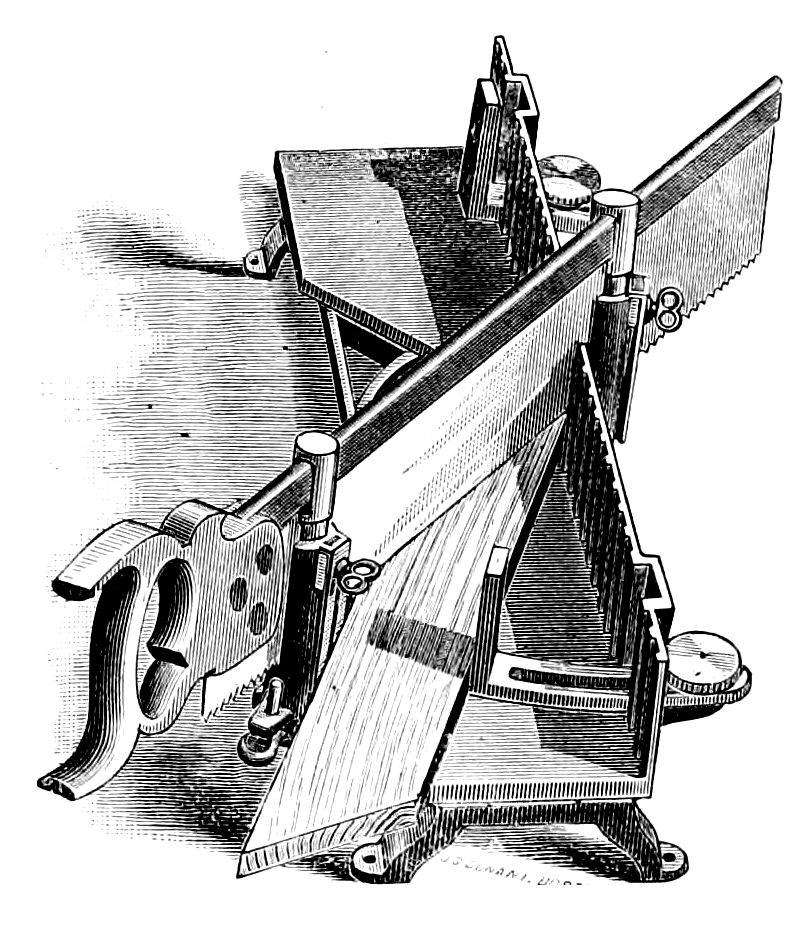
An adjustable miter box used for cutting angles from 45° to 90°

A miter box or mitre box (British English) is a wood working appliance used to guide a hand saw for making precise cuts, usually 45° miter cuts. Traditional miter boxes are simple in construction and made of wood, while adjustable miter boxes are made of metal and can be adjusted for cutting any angle from 45° to 90°.

In many workshops and jobsites miter boxes have been superseded by the powered miter saw, however advocates for miter boxes argue that they are more accurate, safer, quieter, cheaper, and take up less space than a powered miter saw.

== Description ==
=== Basic miter box ===
The most common and simplest form of a miter box is a U-shaped block made from wood, plastic or aluminium, which is open at the top and the ends. The box is made wide enough to accommodate the width of the workpieces to be cut. Slots are cut in the walls of the box at the precise angle at which the cut is to be made. These slots provide the guide for the saw to follow. Most commonly, the slots in the miter box are cut at 45° and 90° angles.

While wooden miter boxes are mass produced, being simple in construction they are often made by woodworkers themselves from three pieces of wood screwed or glued together. The slots are then cut using the same saw that will be used with the box.

Wooden miter boxes have a limited lifespan, as over time the saw wears away the sides and bottoms of the slots, reducing the accuracy of cuts. Some miter boxes are fitted with guides across the top of the box to reduce wear on the slots and to provide rigidity to the box.

Miter boxes can also be purpose-made by the woodworker for cutting angles other than 45° or for cutting compound (sloped) angles, or they can be designed for securing a particular size of workpiece.

=== Adjustable miter box ===
An adjustable miter box is designed for cutting any angle from 45° to 90° degrees. Made of metal, they consist of a base, a fence, and a mechanism for supporting a backsaw at the set angle. The workpiece is held against the fence while the saw is used. Historically a miter saw is a type of backsaw with a wide blade designed for use with an adjustable miter box, however the term is now more commonly used to refer to a powered miter saw, which is a successor of the adjustable miter box.

== Use ==
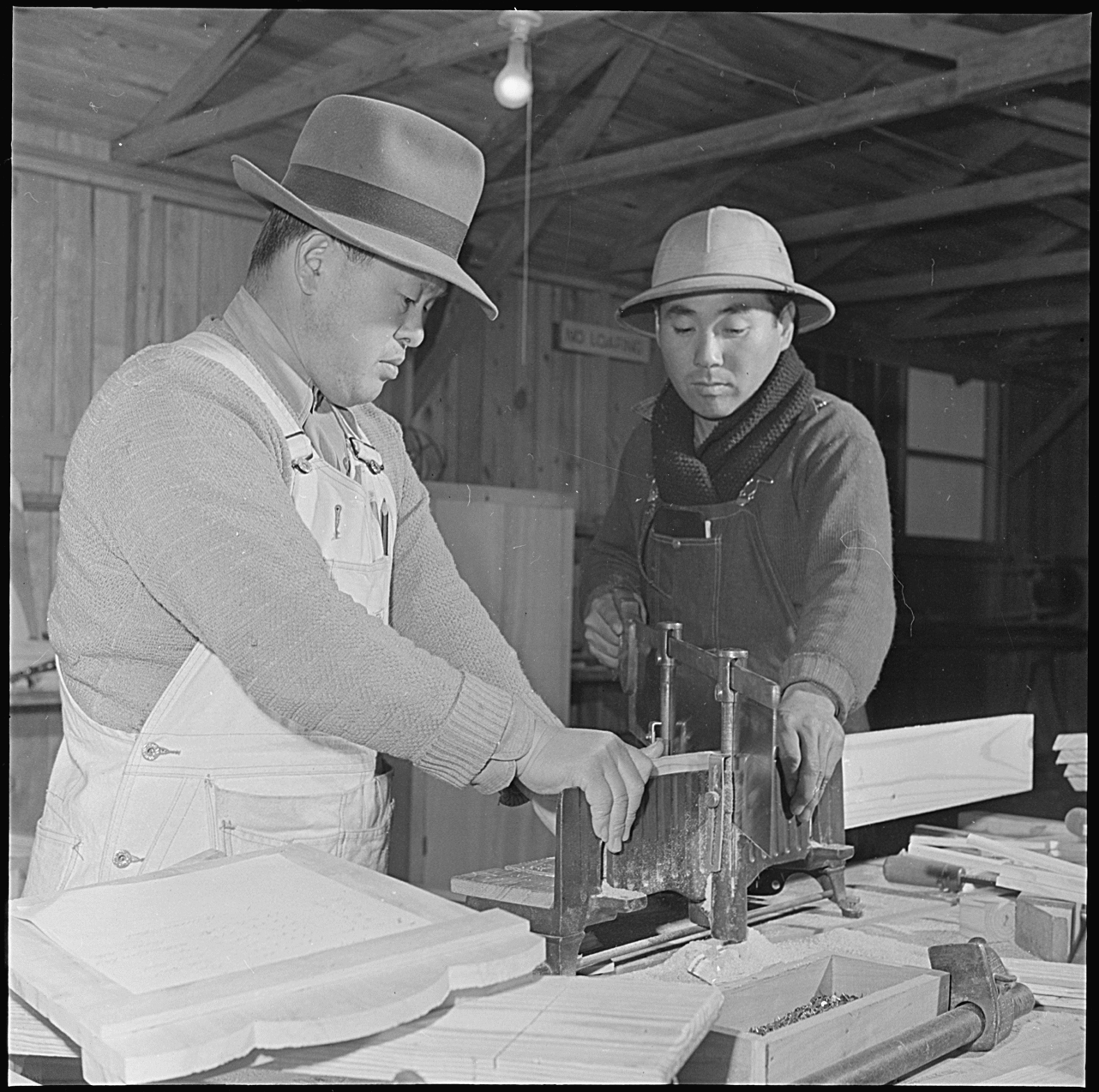
Two incarcerated Japanese Americans using an adjustable miter box to make furniture in the Jerome War Relocation Center, a WWII concentration camp in Arkansas, US.

As well as pieces of wood for use in joinery, the miter box also sees common use in workshops and on jobsites for cutting various types of moulding. For precise work, a workpiece cut in a miter box might then be further refined using a hand plane and shooting board.

=== Basic miter box ===
The workpiece is placed in the box and the point at which the board is to be cut is lined up with the appropriate slot in the sides of the miter box. The workpiece is then held or clamped in place. Backsaws are the most common hand saw used with miter boxes, but other types of hand saw are also used. The saw is placed between the slots before sawing.

=== Adjustable miter box ===
The workpiece is aligned with the saw and held or clamped against the fence. Depending on the miter box design, the cut is then made with either a dedicated miter saw, or another suitable saw that can fit between the guides.

== See also ==
- Bench hook
- Shooting board
- Miter saw
