= Backsaw =

Hand saw with a stiffened back

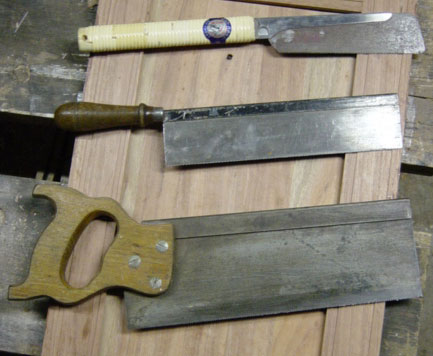
Three backsaws: dōzuki (top), Gent's saw and Tenon saw

A backsaw is any hand saw which has a stiffening rib on the edge opposite the cutting edge, enabling better control and more precise cutting than with other types of saws. Backsaws are normally used in woodworking for precise work, such as cutting dovetails, mitres, or tenons in cabinetry and joinery. Because of the stiffening rib, backsaws are limited in the depth to which they can cut. Backsaws usually have relatively closely spaced teeth, often with little or no set.

== Types of backsaws ==
Backsaws include the tenon saw, the dovetail saw, and the (United Kingdom) sash saw^{1}. Tenon and dovetail saws usually have a pistol grip style handle which may be open or closed at the bottom.

Different types of backsaw include:

- Mitre saw – often referred to as a large backsaw (20–30 inches or 60–90 cm) used either in a wooden or metal mitre box or in a metal frame which allowed cutting mitres of any specified angle. Note that not all mitre saws are backsaws, and the electric mitre saw (or chop saw) has largely taken its place today.
- Tenon saw – a midsized backsaw. The saw derives its name from its use in the cutting of tenons for mortise and tenon joinery. Tenon saws are commonly available with rip-filed teeth for rip cutting and cross-cut for cutting across the grain. Teeth are relatively fine, with 13 teeth per inch being a common size for the saw.
- Sash saw – name that seems to have been used in the 18th and 19th century for a smaller tenon saw, used in fabricating window sashes. The term is also used currently to refer to a thin, flexible saw used to free sashes that have been painted shut.
- Carcass saw – an in-between of a tenon saw and a dovetail saw.
- Dovetail saw – a small backsaw used to cut dovetails. These saws will usually have a higher number of teeth per inch (around 15 - 20 T.P.I.) with teeth sharpened in a rip tooth pattern and minimal set to leave a narrow kerf. This fine rip tooth pattern also works well in cross cutting operations.
- Gent's saw or Gentleman's saw (rare) – a small dovetail saw with a straight turned handle, rather than an open one typical of most saws. The name seems to have arisen from its use by the nineteenth century dilettante who would now be called a hobbyist but it is hard to find a nineteenth century reference to it. For example, in the section on tools in Every Man his own Mechanic (1881) (816pp), tenon, dovetail and sash saws are listed as a group but there is no mention of a gent's saw. It is adapted for use in making joints in very small woodwork such as that in some musical instruments, dolls' furniture or other model-making. Its distinguishing features are its small size and turned handle.
- Razor saw – a very small backsaw having very finely pitched crosscut teeth, often with no set. The Razor saw is used by hobbyists, notably model aircraft, boat, and railroad enthusiasts. Razor saws typically use disposable blades (or are occasionally designed to be completely disposable), since their teeth are so small as to be impractical to re-sharpen. A razor saw is capable of making clean cuts in very soft woods like Balsa, which most other saws would tend to tear out. Unlike most other types of backsaws, razor saws are also frequently used to cut plastics and soft metals.
- Dōzuki – a Japanese backsaw, used for centuries by carpenters and cabinetmakers in Japan. Although this saw does not share an ancestry with the other backsaws in this group, the concept is the same. Like most Japanese saws, the dōzuki cuts on the pull stroke, allowing much straighter and narrower cuts than those achieved with push-stroke saws. This is due to tension on the blade during the cut (versus compression for a western saw), so less thickness is required to keep the saw blade straight.

== Design ==
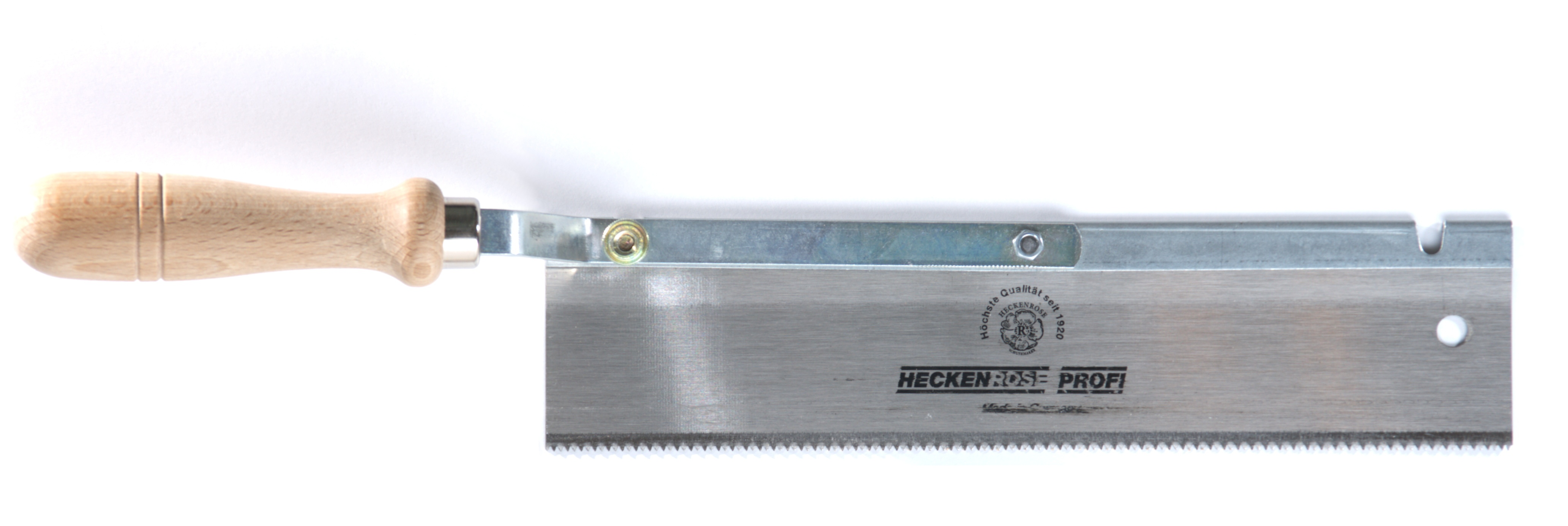
Flush-cutting backsaw (offset saw); handle can be turned to the other side

The work of a backsaw requires a thin, stiff blade. These two immediately incompatible requirements are resolved by swaging (and perhaps, spot welding) a stiffening cap over the length of the top edge of the blade. This thickening of the blade is the back and is generally made from some kind of metal, usually brass or steel. The stiffening back is carried through into the handle so that the blade does not bend between the two. The thickening of the back limits the depth to which the saw can cut but this is generally not a limitation in their typical uses.

== Associated tools ==
- A backsaw is often used in combination with a mitre box to produce precisely angled cuts.
- Another accessory commonly used is the bench hook.
- Another tool associated with the use of backsaws is the marking knife. This leaves a cleaner line than a pencil would and it cuts the fibres at the surface of the wood. Without this, the action of the saw would lift them and leave a ragged edge.

== Footnotes ==
- Note 1: In North America, the name sash saw is used for a frame saw used in sawmilling.
