= Wall chaser =

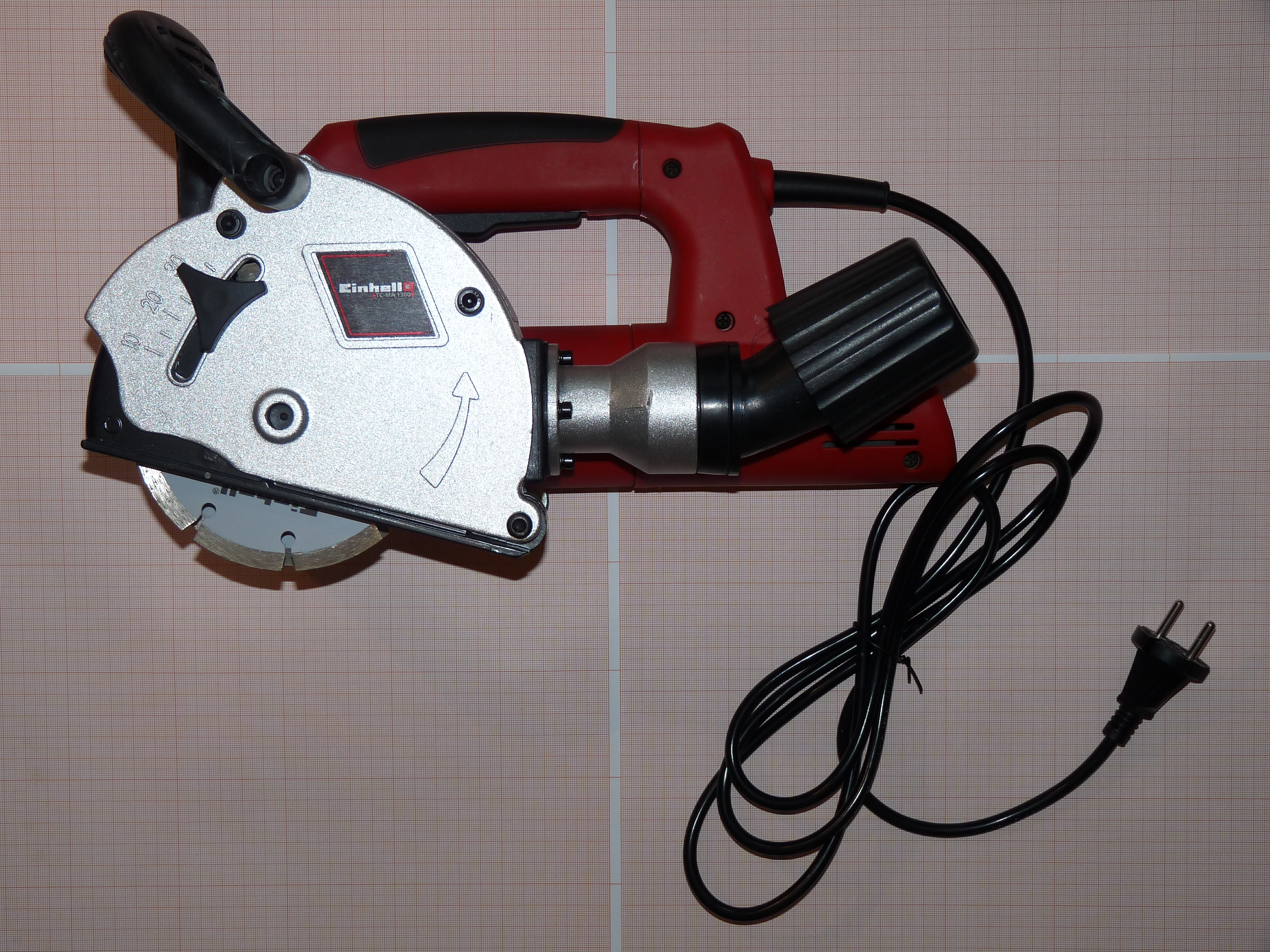
Wall chaser

A wall chaser is a specialised power tool used for cutting narrow grooves in walls, brickwork, blockwork, or concrete. Wall chasers are often used to make chases in walls in order to lay electrical cable inside the walls, with openings about 30mm wide. The tool is usually powered by an electric motor that drives a pair of abrasive discs like those found in an angle grinder, positioned closely together.

== See also ==
- Plunge saw
