= Bench hook =

Woodworking tool

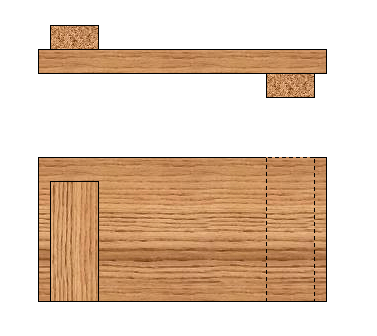
- A simple bench hook made from three pieces of wood
- Other names: Sawing board; Side hook; Saw rest; Side rest
- Classification: Woodworking workbench appliance
- Used with: Workbench; Handsaw

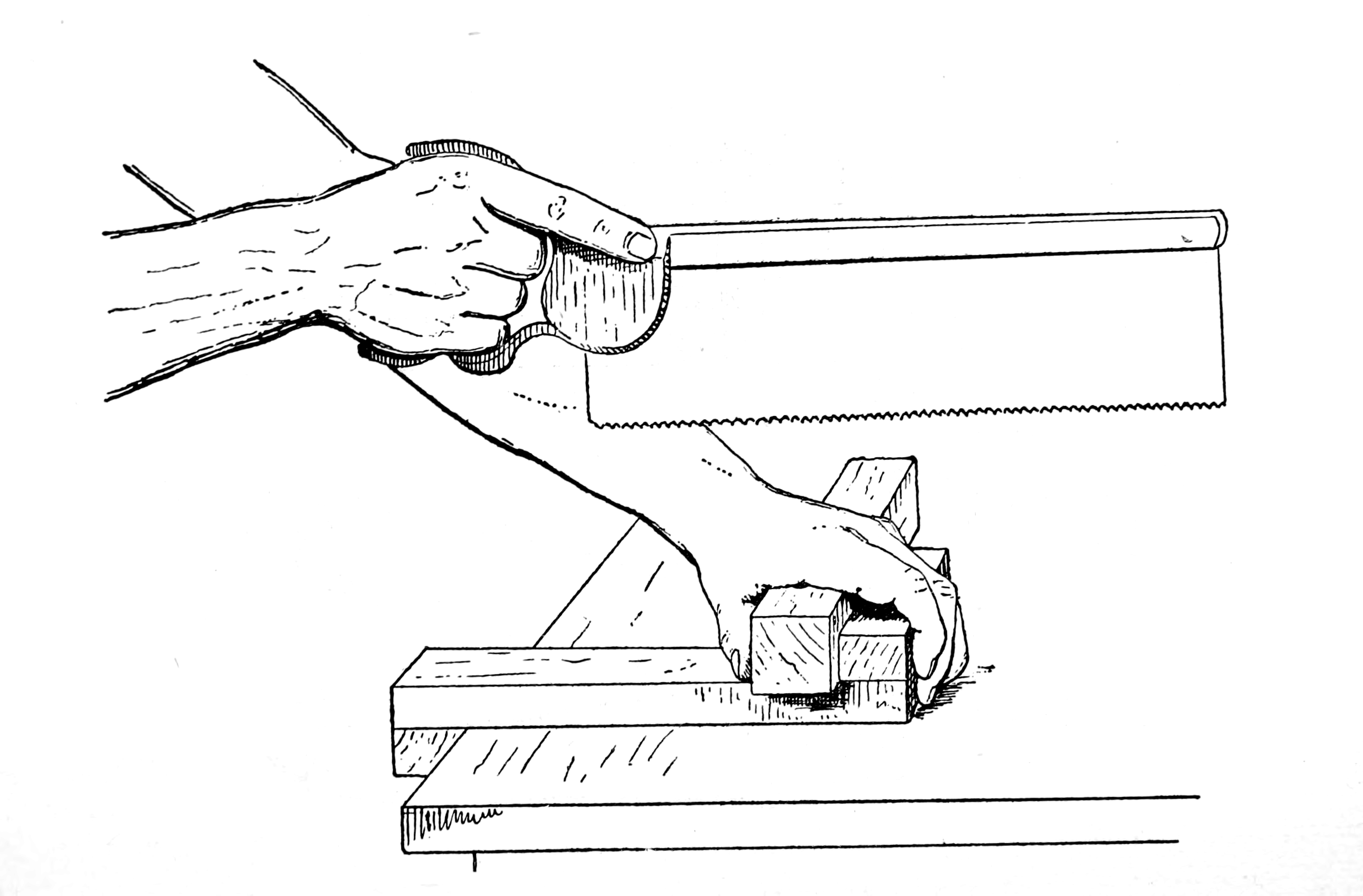
Illustration showing how the workpiece and bench hook are held, ready for sawing.

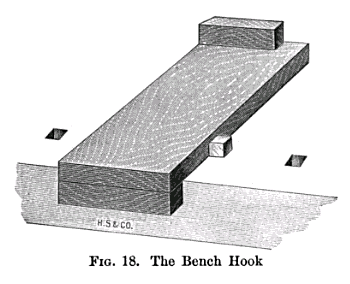
To protect the workbench while sawing the fence doesn't span the full width of the bench hook.

A bench hook is a workbench appliance used to secure wood for many tasks in woodworking. It can be used to hold a workpiece in place while crosscutting with a hand saw. It can also be used to hold stock for carving, planing or other tasks. A bench hook can hold stock and keep it from moving during modifications, improving accuracy and safety.

== Construction ==
Bench hooks are simple in construction and though they can be purchased, they are typically made by the woodworker from offcuts and scraps of timber or sheet goods (such as plywood). The most common type of bench hook is made from three pieces of wood joined together:

- The bed, being anywhere from 7–9 inches (180–230 mm) wide and 5–12 inches (130–300 mm) long depending on preference. The workpiece sits atop the bed, and the bed protects the workbench from the saw.
- The first stop, also called the fence, is fixed across the top of the bed. Usually this stop doesn't span the full width of the bed, so that the end of the stop can be used as a guide while sawing. This way the saw cuts into the bench hook and not the workbench.
- The other stop, or the hook, being as long as the bed is wide, it is fixed into the underside of the bench hook furthest from the first stop.

The three pieces are then screwed, nailed, or glued together depending on the woodworker's preference. It is sometimes recommended to secure the hook with dowels and glue, to avoid risking the saw hitting against a screw or nail.

== Use ==
Usually a bench hook is used with a backsaw, such as a tenon saw or dovetail saw.

In use the bench hook is laid flat onto the workbench, so the hook is sitting over the front of the bench. With one hand the woodworker holds the workpiece firmly against the fence. By pushing against the bench hook a little the woodworker is able to hold the workpiece steady and the bench hook securely against the workbench, freeing the other hand to saw.

Alternatively to prevent it from moving the woodworker might choose to secure the hook into a face vice on the workbench. Similarly clamps can be used to help hold the bench hook or workpiece in place. Bench hooks can also be used for on-site away from the workbench.

== Variations ==
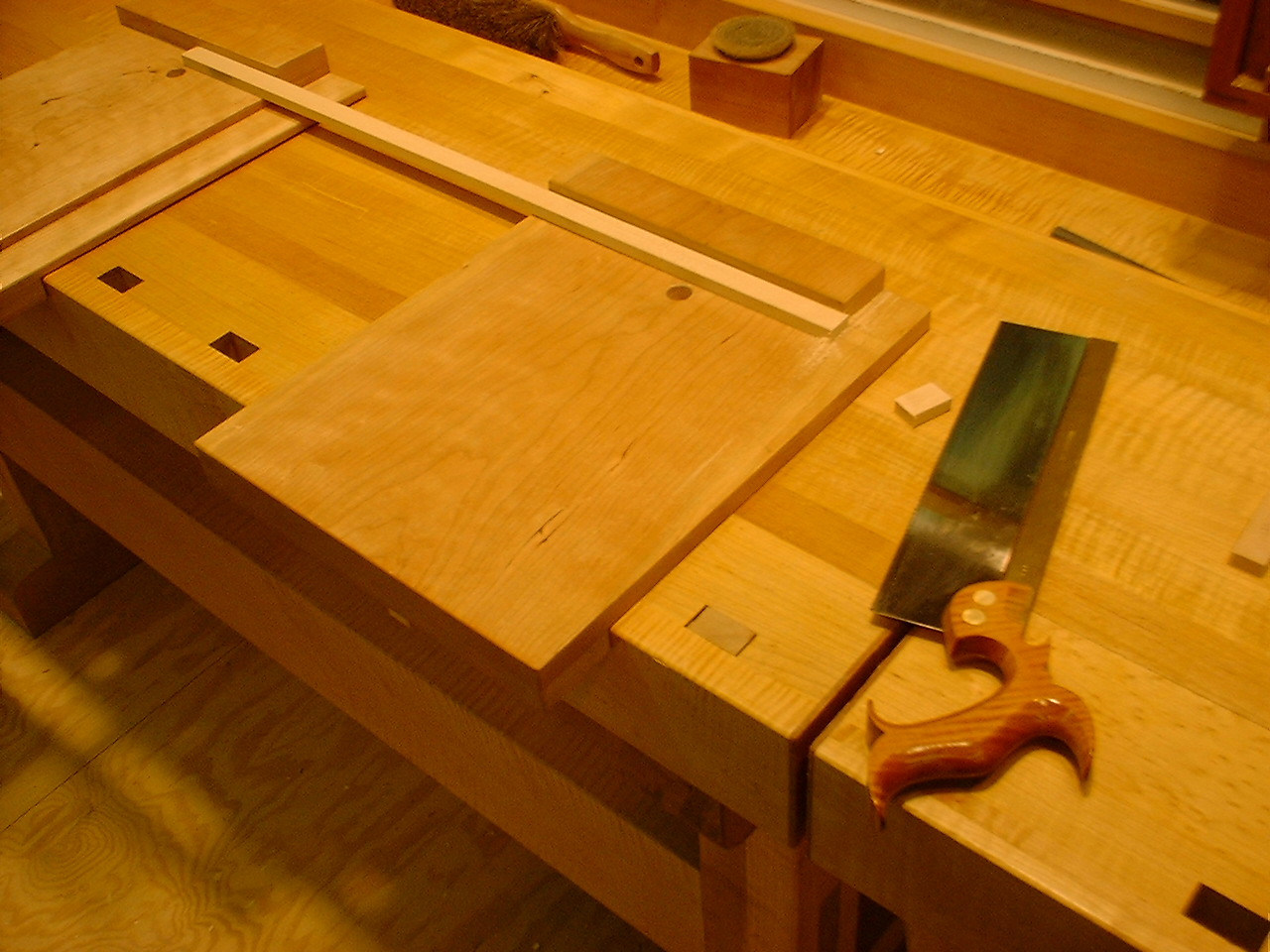
Two bench hooks being used in parallel to support a longer piece of work.

Rather than using the end of the fence to guide the saw, kerfs can be cut into the fence to guide the saw in a manner similar to a mitre box. This design can be used for cutting mitres (angle cuts) as well as regular crosscutting, and can be well suited to precisely cutting small pieces of wood.

If suitably square and flush, the stop that spans the full width of the bench hook (the hook) can also be used as a fence so the bench hook can be used as a short shooting board, for trueing the ends of pieces using a hand plane.

A pair of bench hooks made to the same dimensions can be used in unison for supporting longer pieces of wood.

== See also ==
- Shooting board: a similar workbench appliance used for hand planing true the ends and edges of workpieces.
- Bench dog: a bench dog is used for holding a piece of wood up against the stop so it doesn't move.
