= Frosting (decorative arts) =

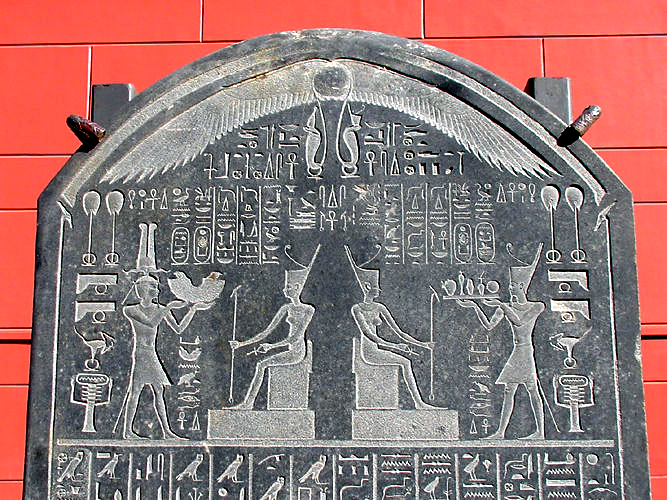
Stele, with Decree of Nectanebo I. (Lunette of the top 1/3 of stele.)

Frosting is a decorative effect named after its resemblance to the appearance of frost. It involves making very small marks in a surface so that it appears matt rather than polished, and in glass opaque rather than optically transparent. It is often used for glass for bathrooms and toilets, but may be used on many materials and created by many processes.

== Examples of ancient Egyptian steles ==
Eventually Ancient Egyptian steles became more than just statements about a topic or events, and became a means of decoration. Later period steles were made in dark stone, some approaching a light or deep black. The twin steles of Nectanebo I, his Decree of Nectanebo I, made into two steles, and mounted in Naucratis and Heracleion, are made in such a manner. The lunette scene of shallow, to medium sunken bas relief, as well as all the Egyptian hieroglyphs are made with a frosting technique. The highest effect can be seen on a stone of a dark background color.

High quality examples of frosting with lighter backgrounds probably exist in Ancient Egyptian art or culture.

== Modern frosting techniques ==
Frosted glass for decoration is probably the most popular use of the frosting technique; it is also a major production style of the light bulb. Additionally, the term is used in woodworking, and is a process for adornment of coins, by frosting.

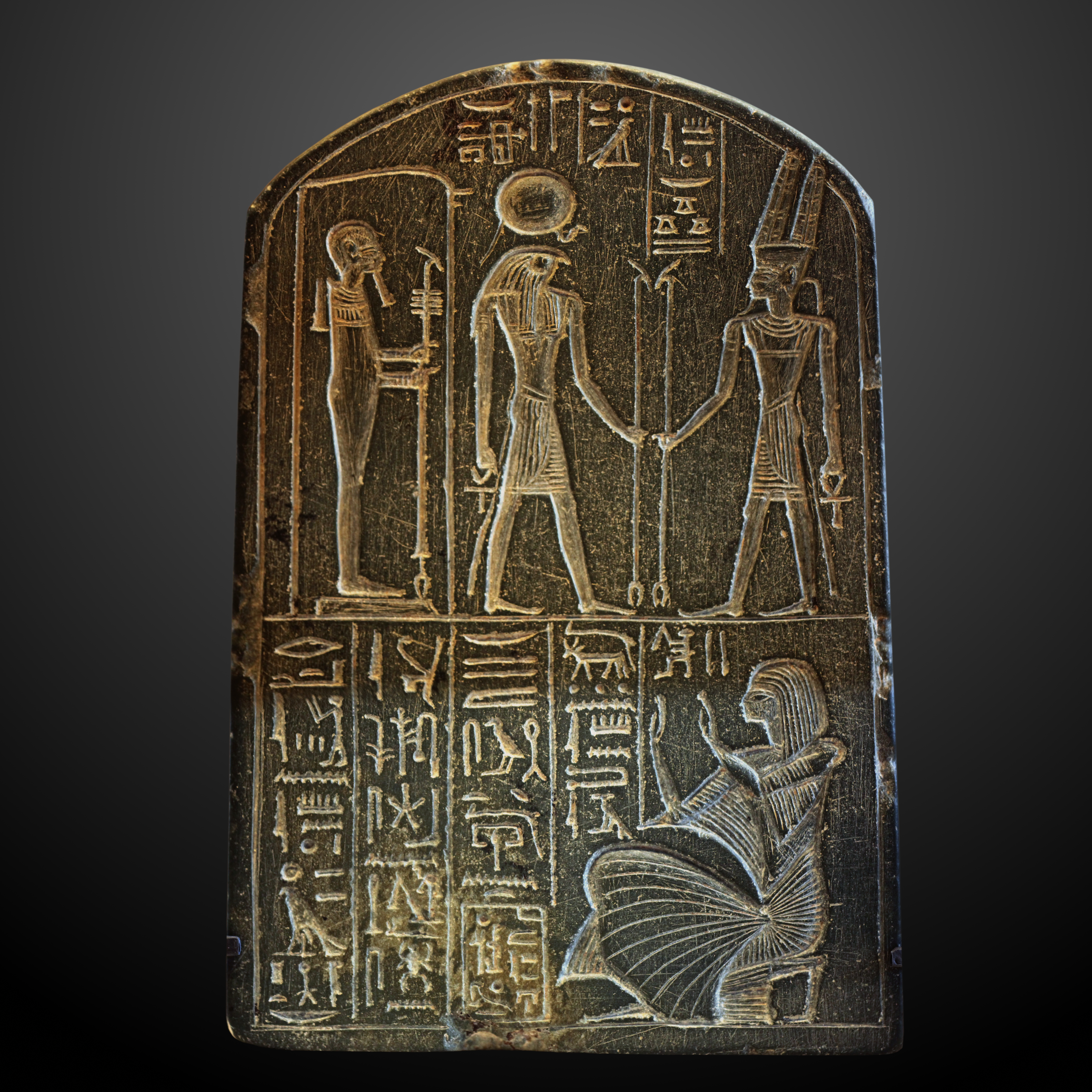
Egyptian stele honoring a scribe, (using the scribe hieroglyph), the presumed honoree of the stele

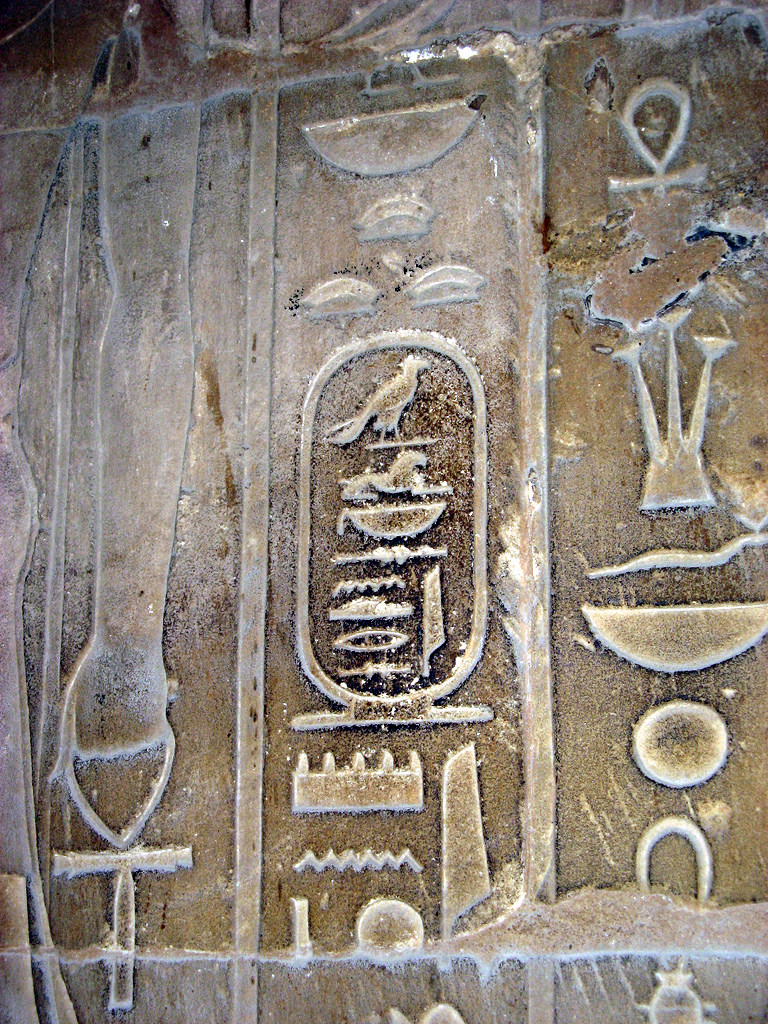
Frosted hieroglyphs in a cartouche and scene parts, sunken incised glyphs, low bas relief

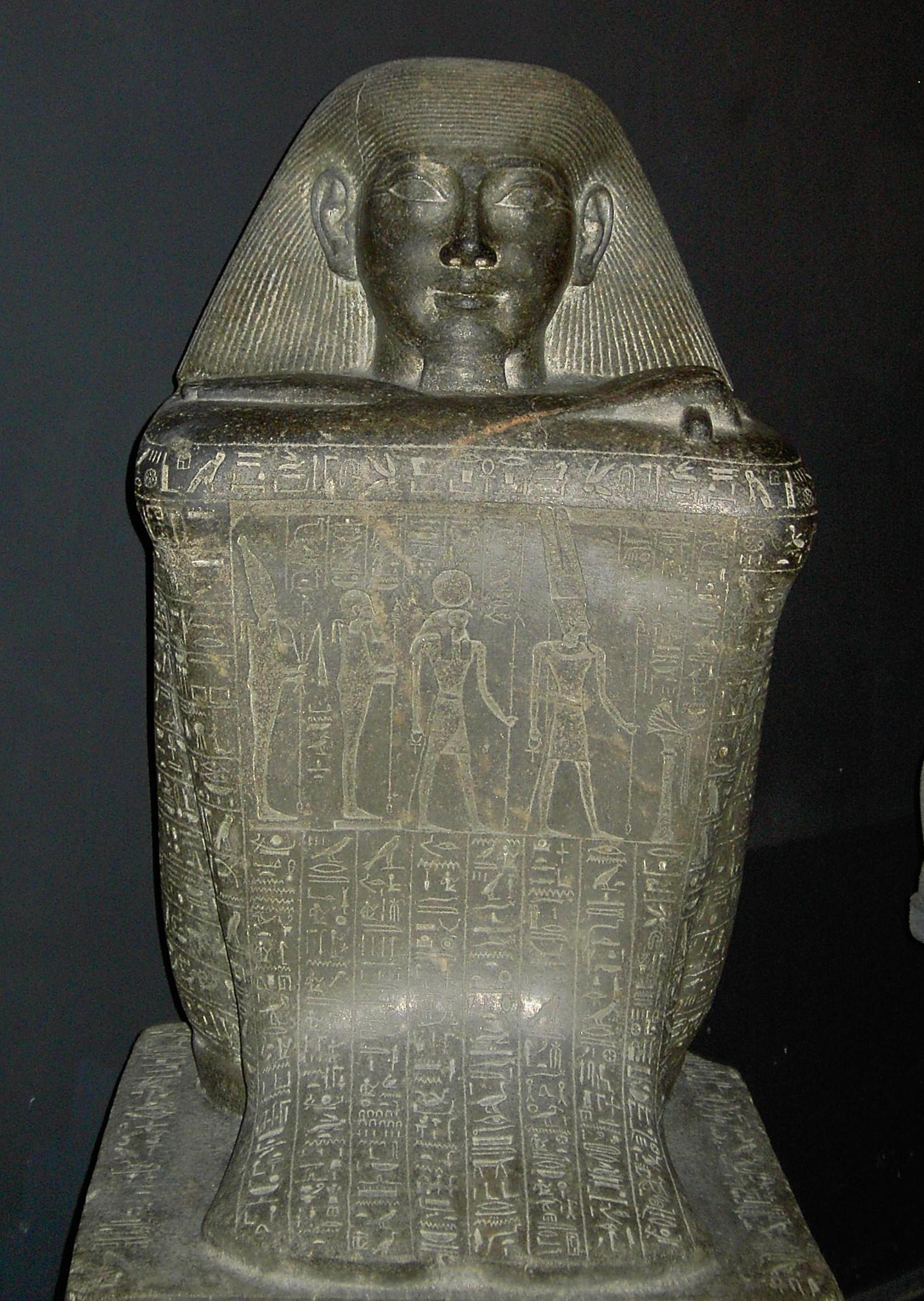
Block statue (Egyptian) of dk granite, (use 2nd click for High-Res), with scene and hieroglyphs in "frosted technique"

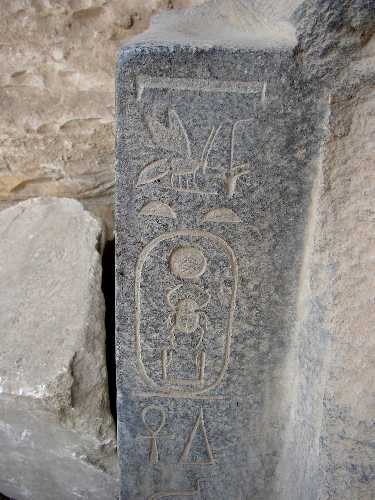
Frosted hieroglyphs and cartouche shown on medium-gray and white stone, Egypt of Pharaoh Senusret I

== See also ==
- Cameo (carving)
- Glossary of woodworking terms
- Frosted glass
