= Fence (woodworking) =

Woodworking tool part

Fences
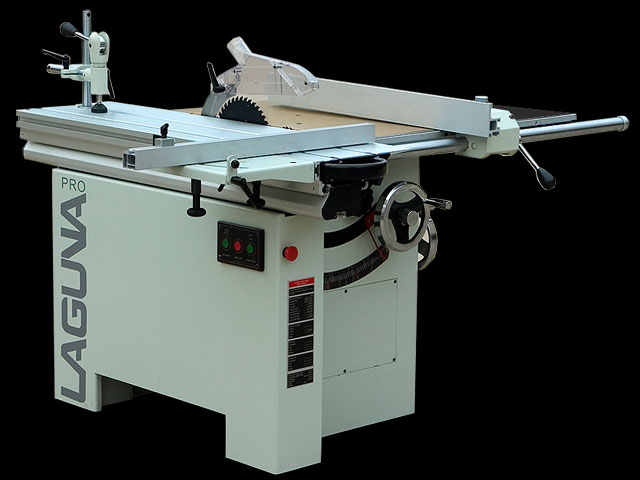
- Table saw with a rip fence parallel to the blade, and a sliding crosscut fence perpendicular to the blade
- Other names: Guides

A fence is a part of many woodworking tools; it is typically used to guide or secure a workpiece while it is being sawn, planed, routed or marked. Fences play an important role for both accuracy and safety. Fences are usually straight and vertical, and made from metal, wood or plastic.

Most fences either remain static with the workpiece guided along it, or are moved relative to the blade.

== Auxiliary and a sacrificial fences ==
An auxiliary or sacrificial fence is a fence made of a material not liable to damage the blade – such as wood or plastic – and is usually attached to an existing fence. Such a fence may be used for situations where it is desirable or necessary for the fence to be in contact with, or particularly close to, the blade. They may also be used for attaching accessories to the fence, such as stop blocks and featherboards. Zero-clearance sacrificial fences can also be used to make cleaner cuts. Such fences may be considered sacrificial as they will be cut into or damaged during use.

== Examples ==
=== Table saws ===
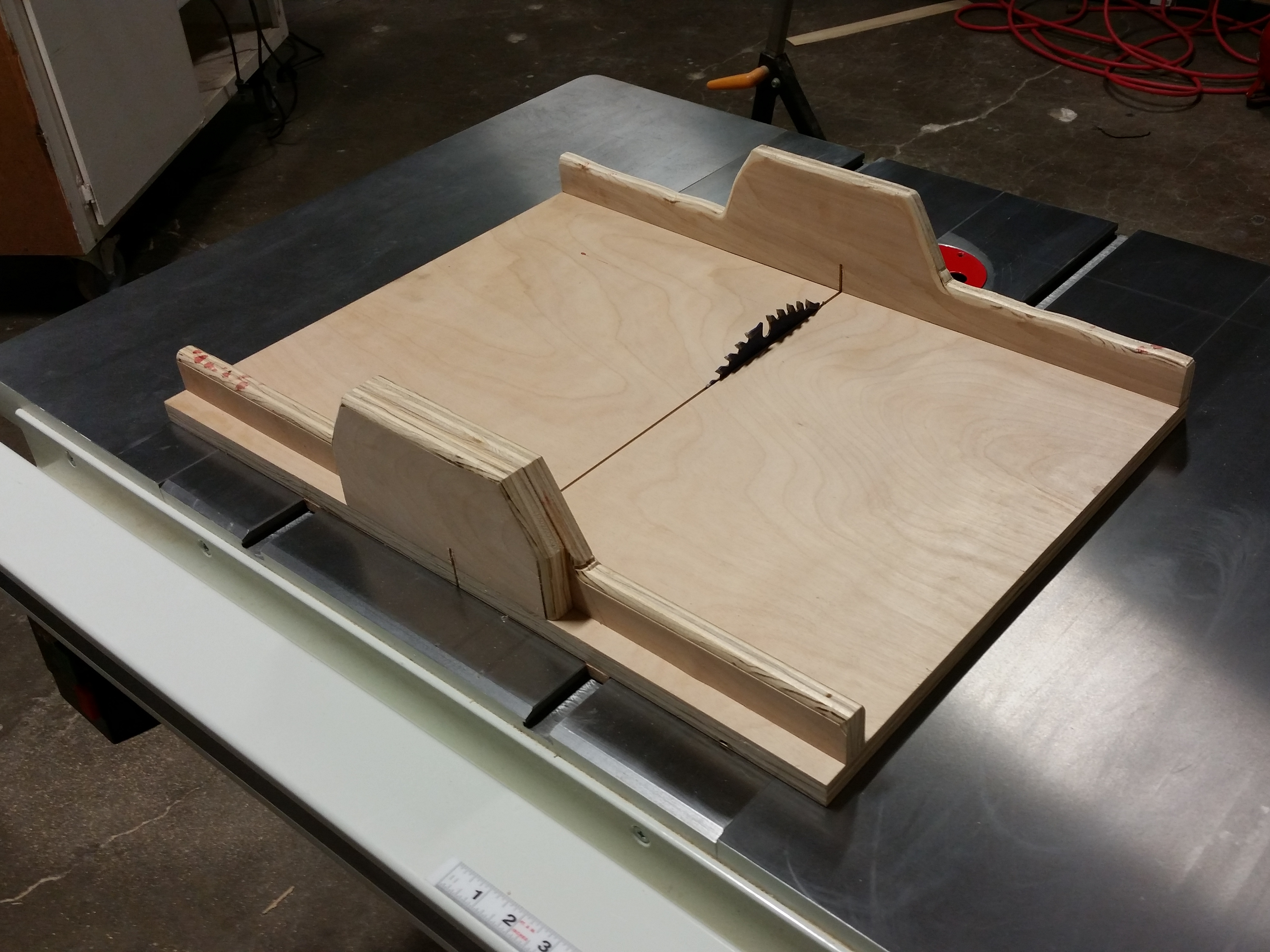
A wooden table saw 90° crosscut sled incorporates a fence.

For safety on a table saw it is necessary that the workpiece is always in contact with a fence or jig – the workpiece is never cut freehand. Failure to use a suitable fence or jig can result in injuries, such as those caused by kick-back.

The most common fence on a table saw is a rip fence, and is provided as standard with any new table saw. The rip fence is parallel to the saw blade and can be adjusted to different distances from the blade to set the size of the final cut. The fence remains static, while the workpiece is guided along the fence.

For crosscuts a sliding cross-cut fence or a mitre gauge – which incorporates a fence – is used. The workpiece is either held or clamped against the fence.

Alternatively a workpiece might be held or secured to a jig, such as a crosscut sled, that will be guided by a fence or tracks in the table surface.

=== Mitre saws and mitre boxes ===
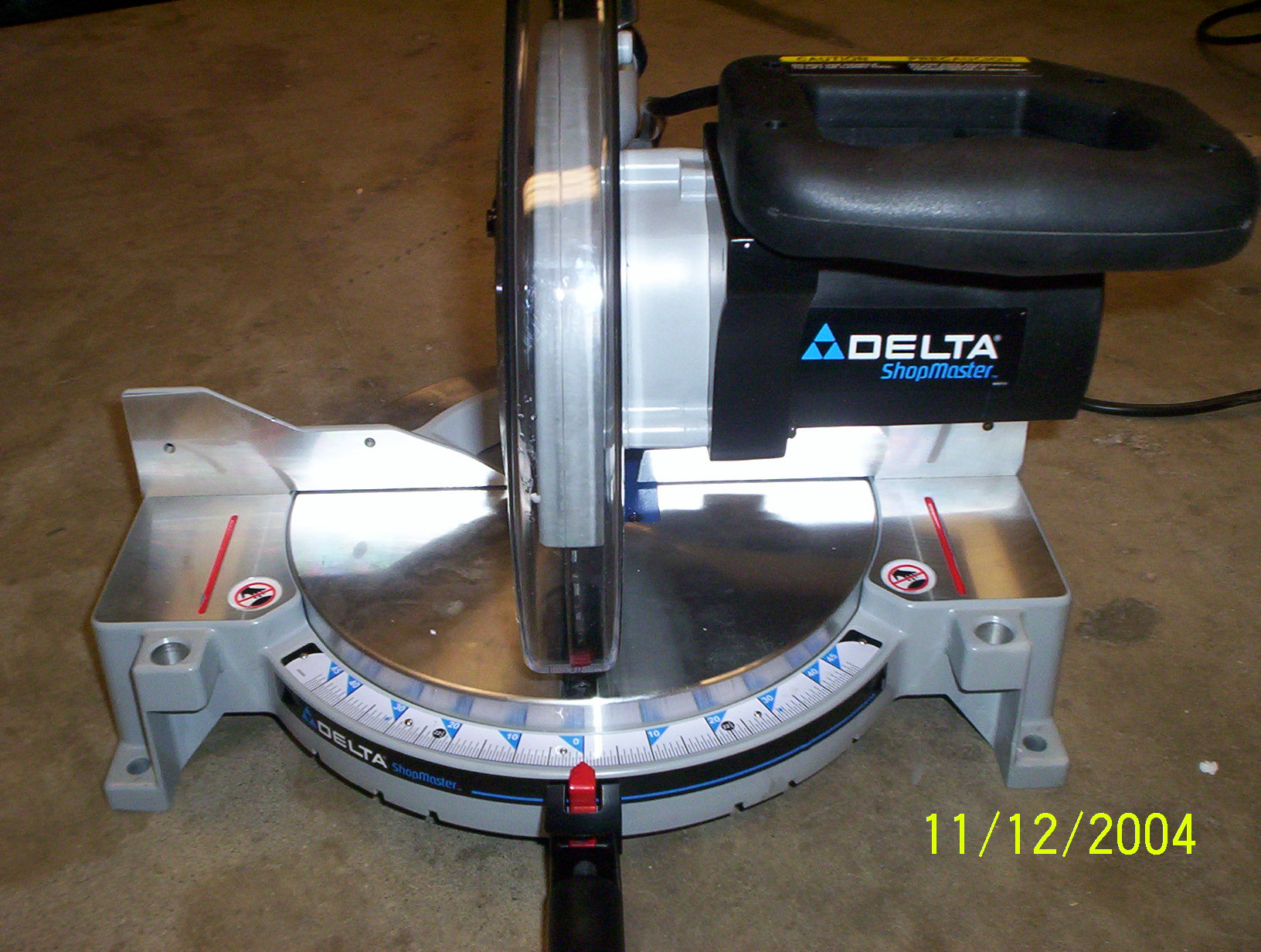
A mitre saw with an aluminium fence on each side of the blade.

Mitre saws and mitre boxes have fences that remains static, with the workpiece held or clamped against them. The saw blade is then moved relative to the fence and workpiece.

=== Router tables ===
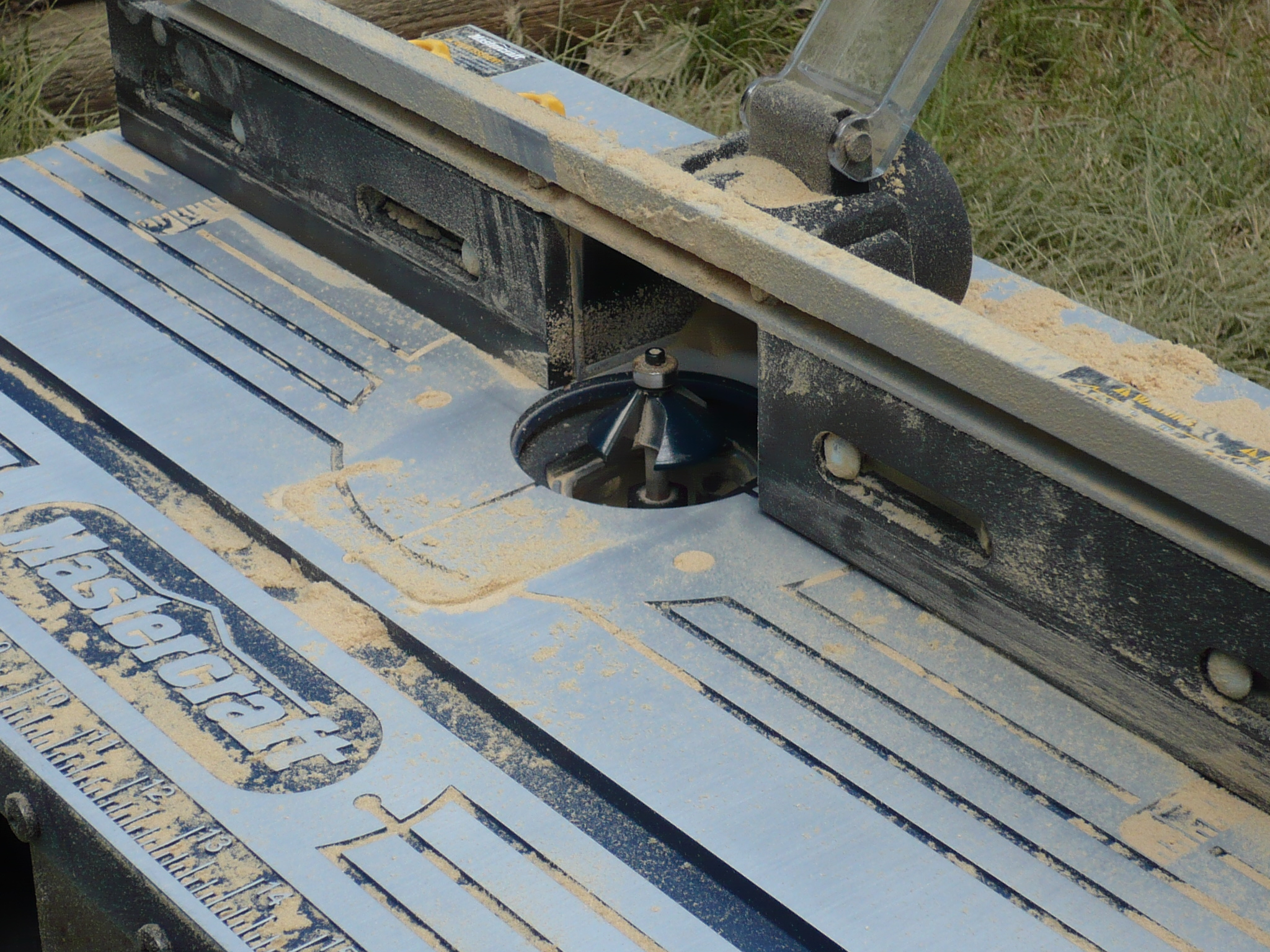
Plastic router table fence, with a gap for the router bit and dust extraction.

Router tables usually incorporate a fence which has a gap in the middle for the router bit. The fence can be adjusted relative to the table and router bit. Once adjusted the fence remains static, while the workpiece is guided along it.

Many router table fences also incorporate a nozzle behind the router bit for connecting a dust extractor or shop vac.

=== Planers ===
A planer, also known as a jointer, has a fence along the length of the tool, perpendicular to the blade. The fence remains static while the workpiece is guided along it.

=== Biscuit joiners ===
Biscuit joiners incorporate a fence, with a basic fence able to cut 0° and 45° slots.

=== Marking gauges ===
Marking gauges incorporate a fence that can be adjusted to set the distance between the fence and scribe or blade. In use the fence moved along the edge of the workpiece.

=== Woodworking appliances ===
Appliances such as shooting boards, bench hooks and mitre boxes include static fences that the workpiece is held or clamped to.

== Gallery ==
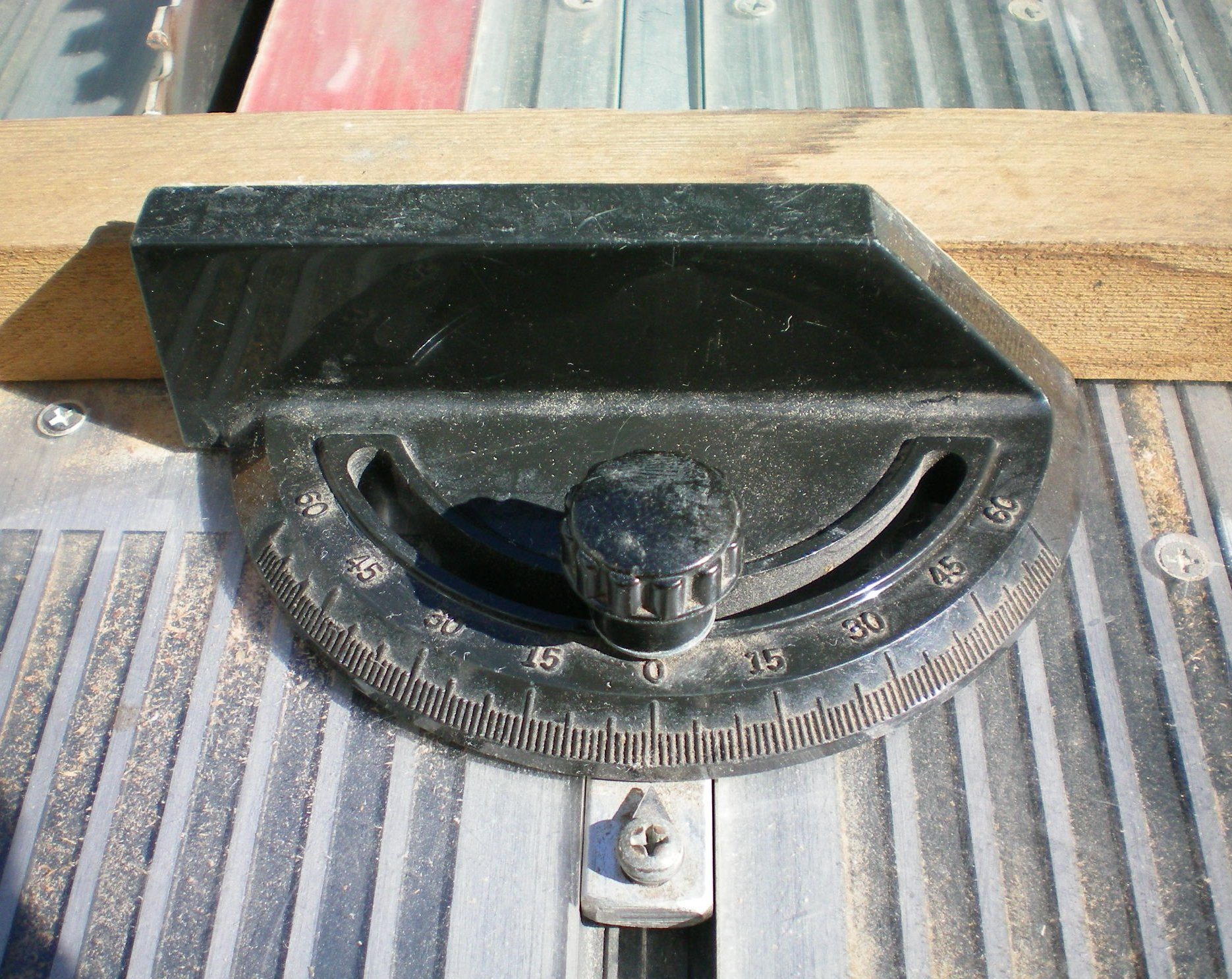
A table saw mitre gauge incorporates a fence.

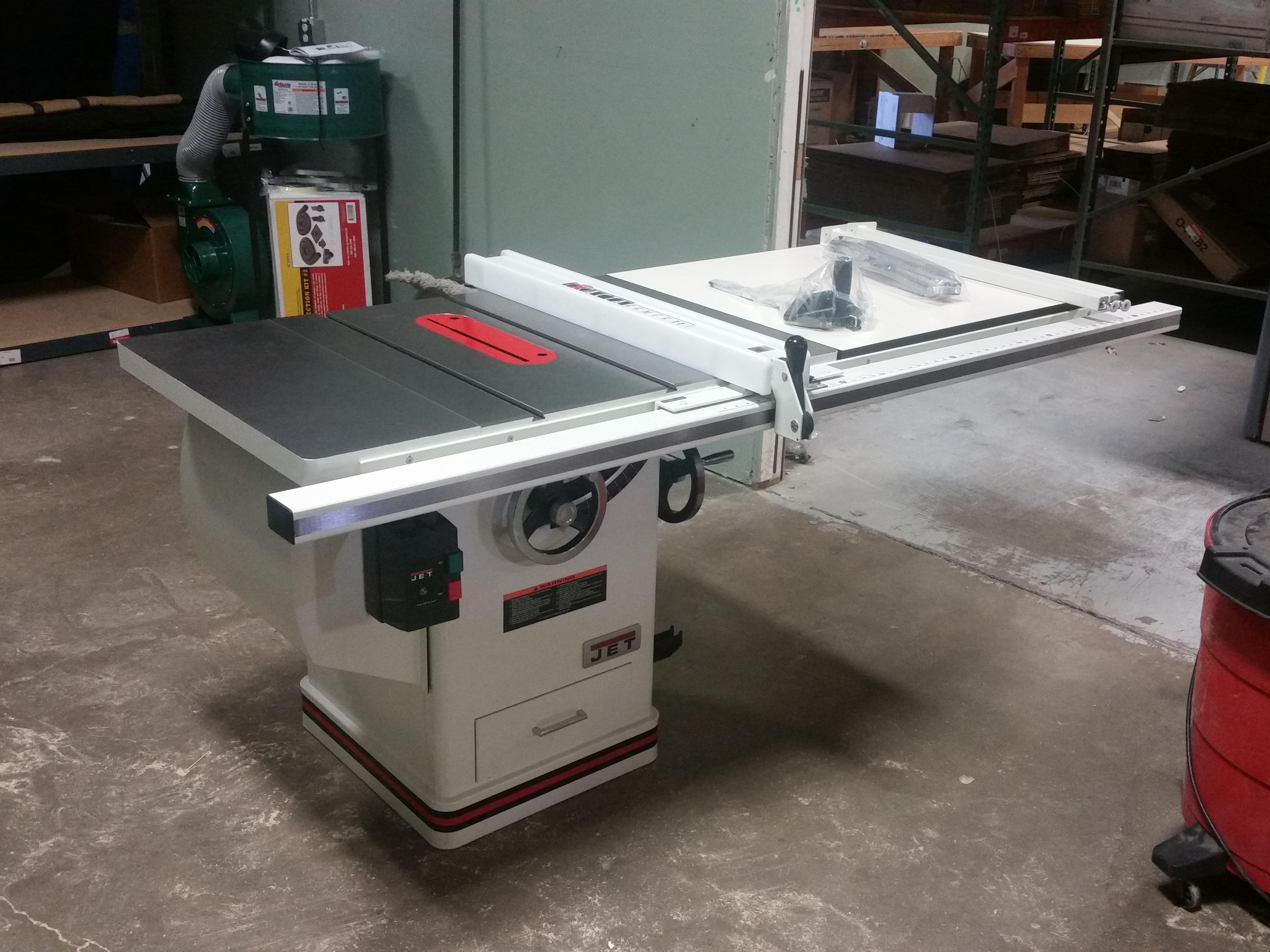
A standard rip fence on a table saw.

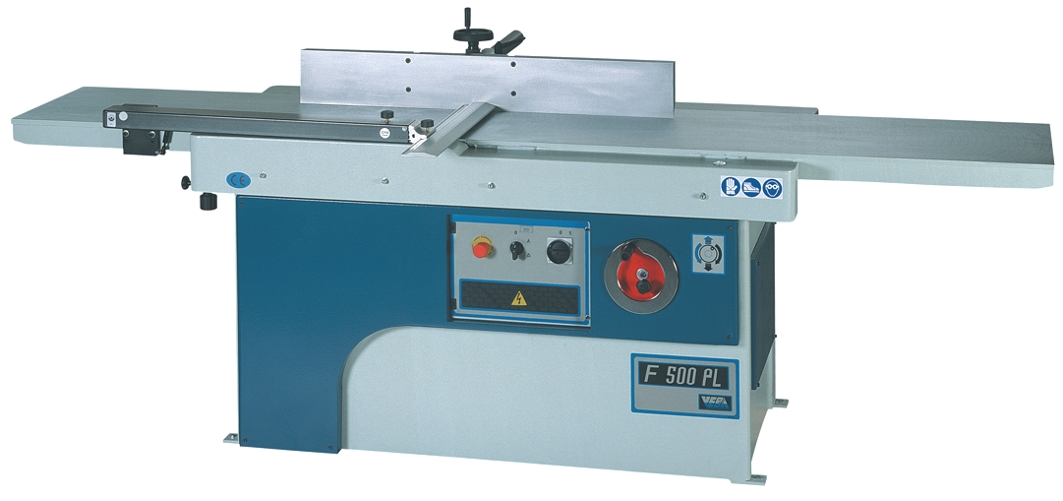
Planer, or jointer, with a standard vertical metal fence.

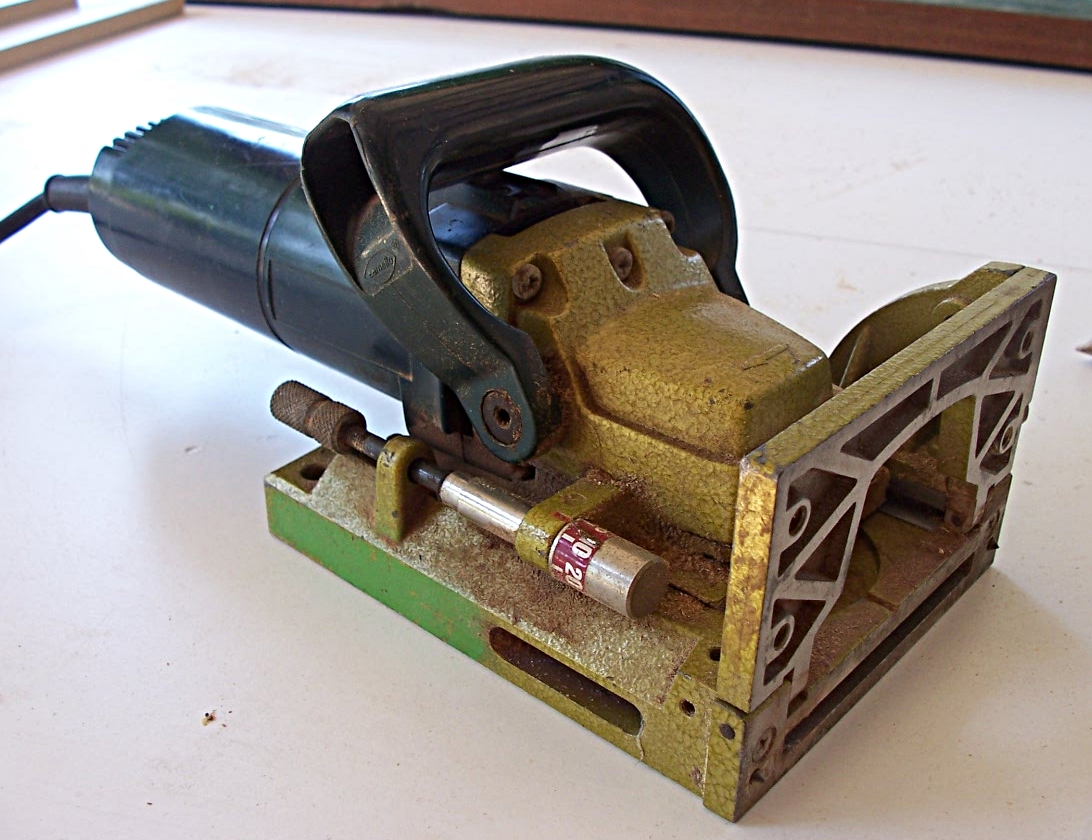
Biscuit joiner with the fence (front) set at 90°.

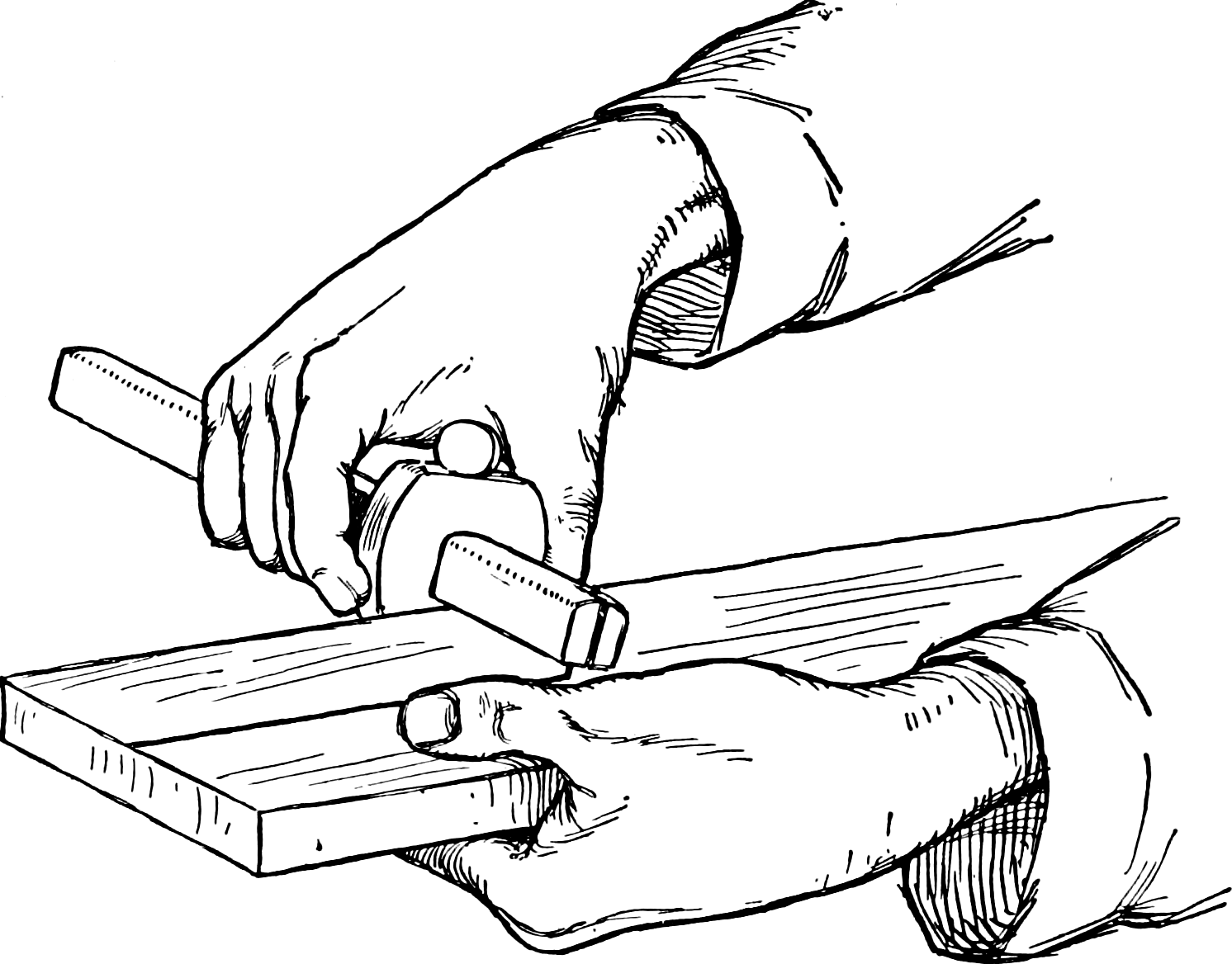
A marking gauge fence is guided along the edge of the workpiece.

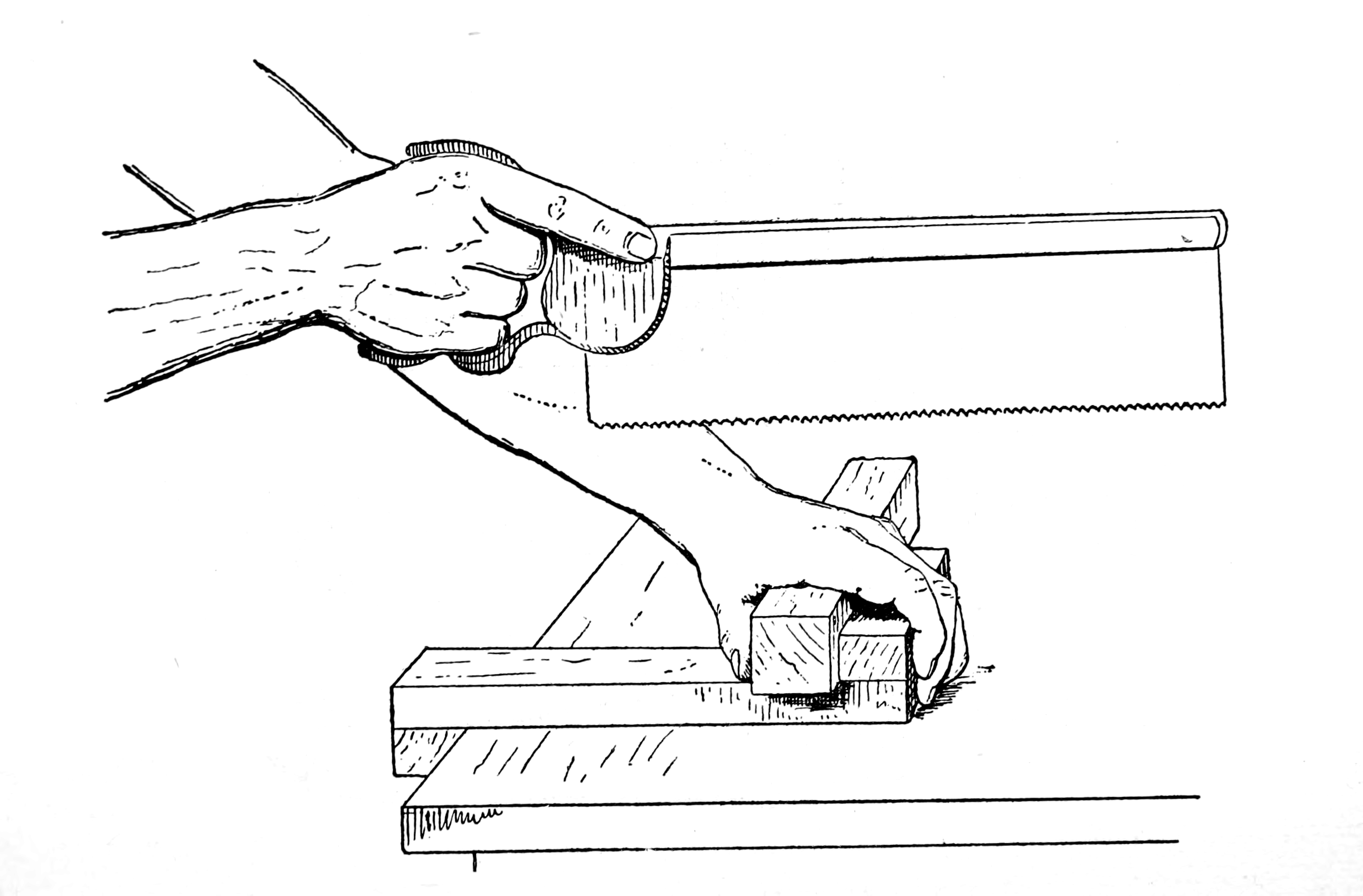
The workpiece is held against the fence of a bench hook.

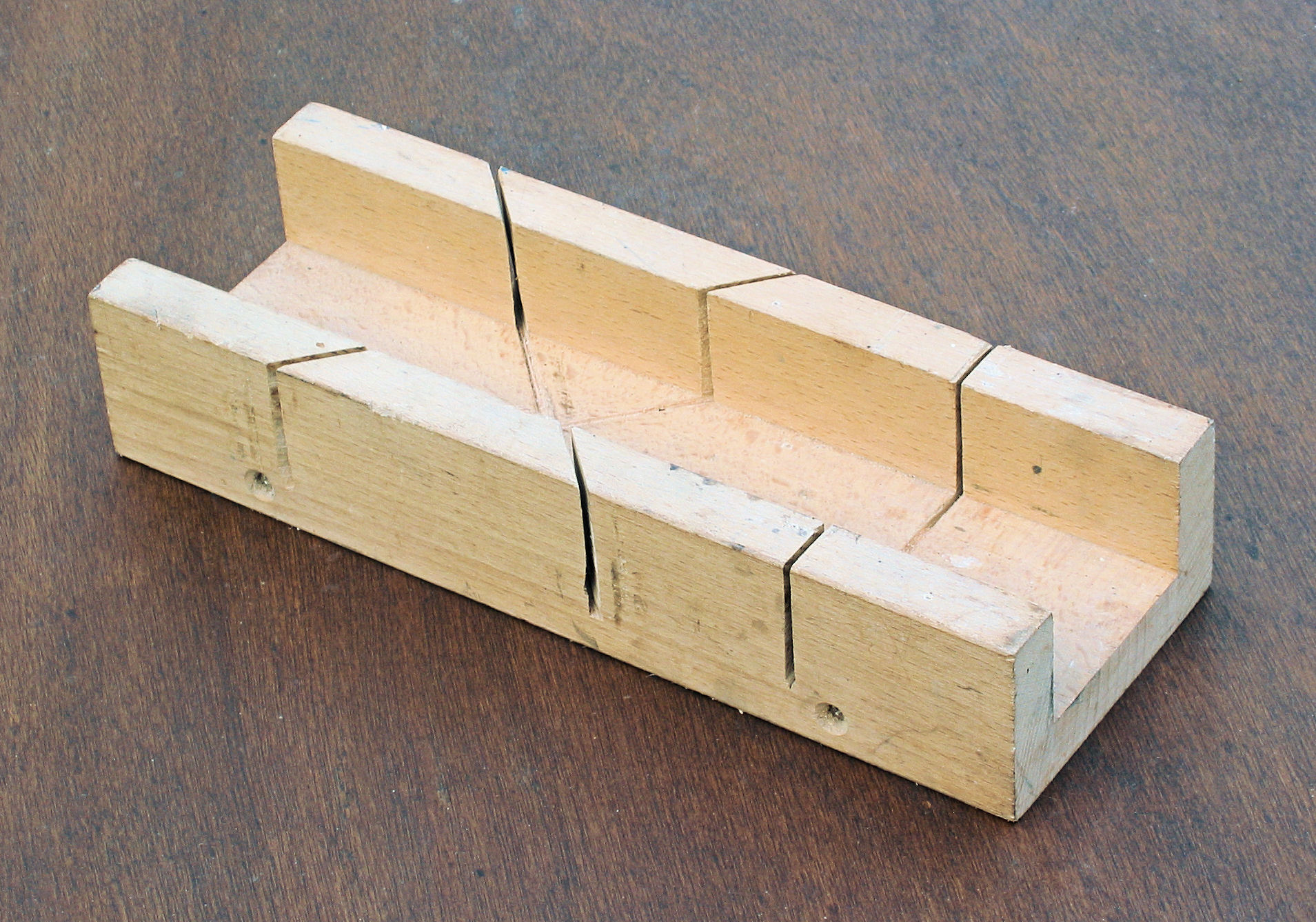
The sides of a basic mitre box act as a fence.
