= Miter saw =

Mechanical saw used to obtain precise angle cuts

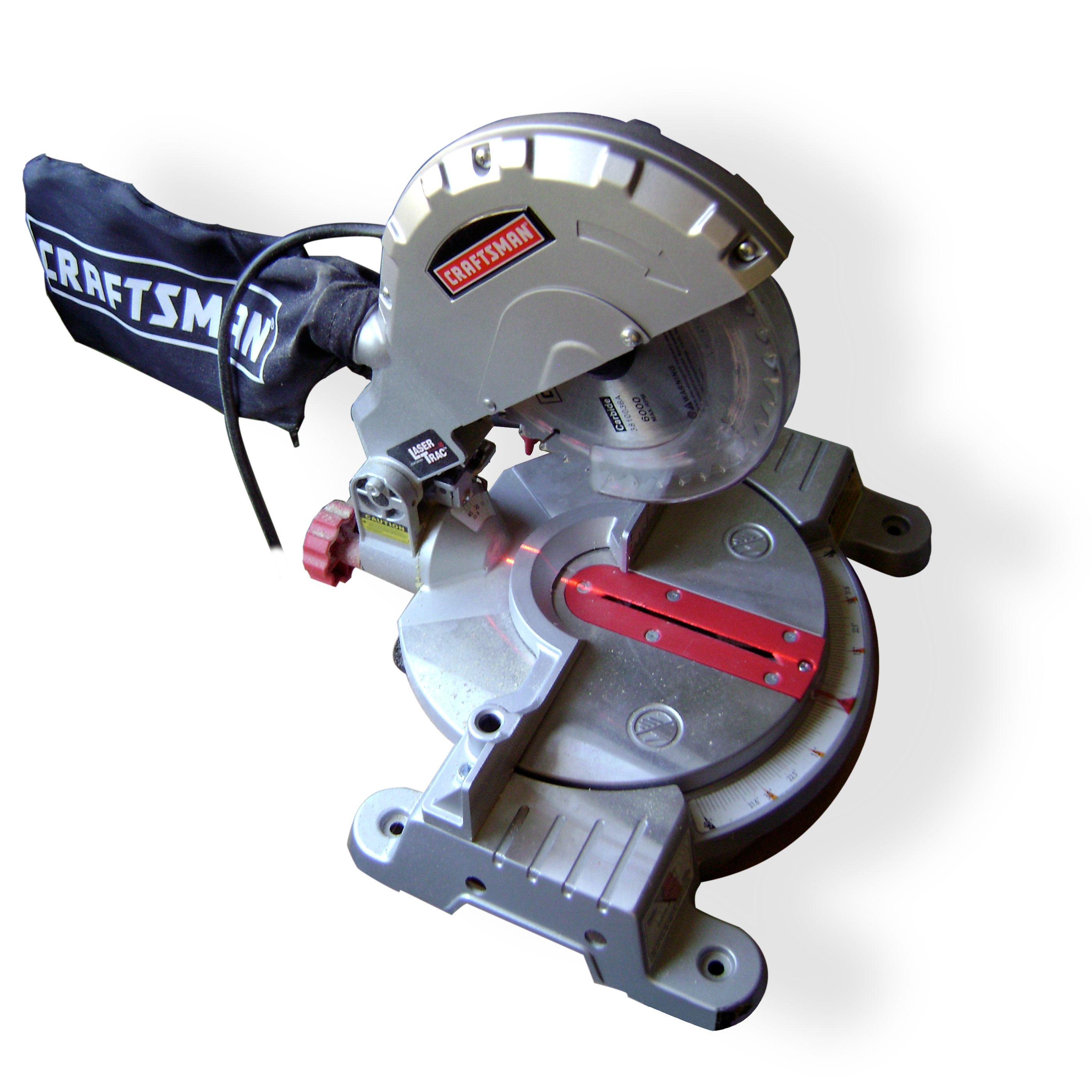
A motorized miter saw

A miter saw (British English: mitre saw) or "drop saw" is a saw used to make accurate crosscuts and miters in a workpiece by positioning the workpiece across the table of the saw and depressing the spinning blade onto a board. A miter saw in its earliest form was composed of a back saw in a miter box, but in modern implementation consists of a powered circular saw that can be positioned at a variety of angles and lowered onto a board positioned against a backstop called the fence.

Powered miter saws also cut bevels into a work piece by adjusting the vertical tilt axis of upper portion of the machine while the table lays flat horizontally. A miter saw for which the axis can be tilted in a single direction is known as a single compound miter saw. If the axis can tilt both left and right, it is known as a double bevel compound miter saw. Some are equipped with a sliding rail system or have a pivot arm to cut wider work pieces when laid flat on the table of the saw and flush against the fence. This is known as a sliding compound miter saw.

They are primarily used for cutting wood trim and molding, but also can be used to cut metal, masonry, and plastics, provided the appropriate type of blade is used for the material being cut.

Miter saws come in a variety of sizes. The most common sizes are 180, 250 and 300 mm (7 1/4, 10 and 12 in) size blades, each of which has its own cutting capacity.

Both corded and cordless versions of the saw are available from several different manufacturers.

A common misnomer that is sometimes used to refer to a miter saw is the chop saw. Although somewhat similar in their cutting action, they are two entirely different types of saw. A chop saw is specifically meant to cut metal and is typically operated while laid flat on the ground with the blade fixed at 90° vertical. A chop saw cannot make a miter cut unless manipulated by the operator as opposed to the function of the machine itself.

== Power miter saw ==
A power miter saw, also known as a drop saw (not to be confused with "chop saw"), is a power tool used to make a quick, accurate crosscut in a workpiece at a selected angle. It is commonly used for cutting of molding and trim. Most miter saws are relatively small and portable, with common blade sizes ranging from 200 to 300 mm (8 to 12 in).

The power miter saw was invented by Ed Niehaus, the Chief Engineer in the Power Tool Division for Rockwell International, in 1964. The miter saw showcased several innovations still found today: radial arc spring action, blade braking and dust collection. Rockwell did not patent the design, leading to a large number of manufacturers and innovation improvements.

The power miter saw makes cuts by pulling a spinning circular saw blade down onto a workpiece in a short, controlled motion. The workpiece is typically held against a fence, which provides a precise cutting angle between the plane of the blade and the plane of the longest workpiece edge. In standard position, this angle is fixed at 90°.

A primary distinguishing feature of the miter saw is the miter index that allows the angle of the blade to be changed relative to the fence. While most miter saws enable precise one-degree incremental changes to the miter index, many also provide "stops" that allow the miter index to be quickly set to common angles (such as 15°, 22.5°, 30°, and 45°).

=== Types ===
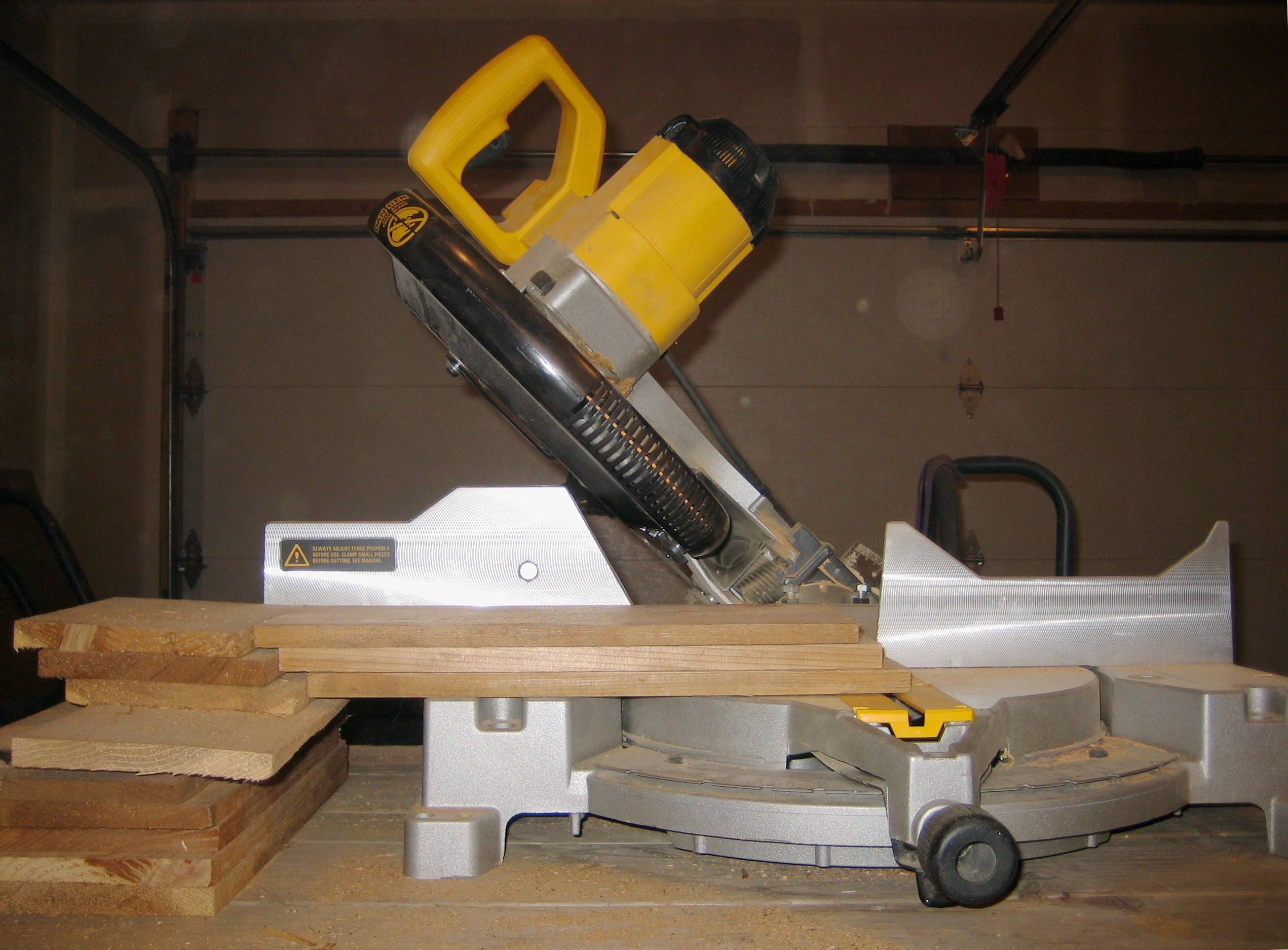
A compound-miter saw

There are several types of miter saws:

- Original miter box and saw - The first miter saws usually consisted of a wooden or plastic three-sided box with 90° and 45° slits to guide a hand or back saw to make miter cuts in a piece of work.
- Power/Standard miter saw - A powered version designed generally for making straight cross cuts on a piece of work at a wide range of angles (unlike an abrasive saw which can only cut 90 degrees to the board). They are commonly used to create 45° degree straight cuts for framing.
- Compound-miter saw - Compound miter saws have the added benefit of tilting the blade and head at various angles to the workpiece. This makes bevel cuts possible. A bevel cut is an angled ramp cut into the side of the wood. This type is commonly used in trim work for homes. A compound cut is a combination of a miter and bevel cut.

Compound miter saws are suitable for more complex woodworking projects, as they offer the versatility of being able to make both miter and bevel cuts. They typically have a tilting blade that can pivot to the desired angle for the bevel cut, and can also be adjusted to make precise cuts at various angles for the miter cut.

- Dual compound-miter saw - Dual or double compound saws allow the head to rotate when angled on both the left and right-hand sides. This means all angles are achievable without repositioning the workpiece.
- Sliding compound-miter saw - Sliding miter saws are able to move the saw head back and forth on a sliding rail, similar to a radial arm saw. This increases the size capacity of which a board can be cut. This type of saw can also allow for the locking of the rails to use for straight, pull down cuts (like chop saws). With the sliding feature engaged, the user pulls the head forward, turns on the saw and pushes the blade backwards into the lumber. This daw is also capable of making full width partial thickness cuts impossible with a mon sliding saw.
- Laser/LED miter-saws - Some saws have a laser guide for more precise cutting. The laser is made up of a disc-shaped washer that attaches to the saw blade and illuminates a line where the blade will cut. Some saws also have an LED feature to better illuminate the work area.

=== Features ===
Miter saws are dedicated cross cut saws; long rip cuts (in line with the grain) are not possible.

A laser guide provides a precise visual indication of where the cut will be positioned on the workpiece in the current configuration. Some models provide a single reference line for one side of the kerf, while others provide two lines to reflect the total kerf width. A blade guard is a cover for the teeth of the cutting blade. Most modern miter saws have self-retracting blade guards, which automatically retract when the saw is lowered onto a workpiece and re-cover the blade when the saw is raised. It is very dangerous to use the saw if these guards are removed or damaged. A dust bag connects directly to the saw, and helps to collect sawdust away from the workpiece during cutting. Optionally, many manufacturers sell adapters to connect an industrial vacuum cleaner in lieu of a bag to capture more of the dust and simplify disposal. Dust removal with these saws is notoriously poor, though DIYers have built dust hoods with high volume dust extractors that are said to remove much more dust. A safety clamp helps to lock a workpiece into position prior to making a cut. This is an especially important feature when cutting smaller workpieces (200 mm (8 in) or smaller). The miter table is typically less than 610 mm (24 in) in diameter. Typically, the work needs to be supported on the far end to stabilize the piece while cutting.

Miter saws are somewhat less hazardous than hand held saws, as the work piece is held stationary against a fence while the saw head moves, making kick-back rarer, and normally allowing hands to be kept clear of the blade. Also the saw head is usually drawn back, then lowered and fed forward through the material so that binding is unlikely.

Sliding compound miter saws are relatively portable, easy to set up, and robust enough to maintain accuracy even when moved around. Because they cut from above it is not necessary to adjust blade depth for different thicknesses of work piece and, like any bench machine, repeat cuts are very easy. Most saws have an adjustable scale plate for table swiveling, with positive stops at commonly used angles. Also, there are usually adjustable stops at 90 and 45 degrees for tilting the head, allowing easy and very accurate adjustment of the saw.

Table swiveling in both directions is universal but most saws allow head tilting only in one direction (counter-clockwise), although some saws allow head tilting in both directions. Normally the work piece is held flat on the table and so table swiveling will produce a miter cut (blade vertical and angled across work piece), head rotation a bevel cut (blade angled from vertical and square across work piece), and in combination a compound cut.

One of the main disadvantages is relatively poor wood chip and dust extraction, as so much of the blade is exposed when cutting, especially in bevel cuts; consequently there is a tendency for chips to fly about.

=== Miter saw blades ===
Miter saws commonly come in 250 and 300 mm (10 and 12 in) blade size configurations and are commonly made of carbon steel and may come with a coating to make the cut easier.

While the blade sizes are interchangeable with table saws, a miter blade is optimized for short cross-cuts across the grain of the wood with little pull, where as table saws are optimized for long rip cuts with the grain and pulling the material into the blade.

Blades are marked with their number of teeth, kerf and hook angle. Tooth counts ranges vary from 24 to 100 teeth per inch (about 1 mm to 0.25 mm between each tooth). Blades with larger tooth counts results in finer but slower cuts. The kerf thickness denotes how much material is removed when making the cut. The standard being a 3.2 mm (1/8 in) kerf with thinner options for working finer wood. The hook angle denotes how aggressively the blade will pull the material in. A low hook angle or even a negative hook angle is designed to cause little board movement during cutting of unclamped boards.

Teeth design comes in many variations: ATB (alternating top bevel), FTG (flat top grind) and TCG (triple chip grind) are the most common. Each design is optimized for a specific material and edge treatment.

An arbor bolt holds the blade to the saw rotor and its diameter must match the blade hole size in order to properly secure the blade (300 mm (12 in) blades commonly use 25 mm (1 in) arbor holes and 250 mm (10 in) blades favor 16 mm (5/8 in)). To prevent the saw from loosening the arbor bolt, the threads are reverse-threaded, so that the rotational spin of the saw blade exerts a tightening pressure on the blade.

=== Development ===
Power miter saws have been available in various forms since the 1970s as specialized cross cut saws but with limited width of cut, especially compared to radial arm saws. Simple miter saws allowed the saw table to pivot allowing miters to be cut in one plane. Compound miter saws also provided saw head tilting allowing compound miters to be cut. Miter saws with abrasive cutting wheels are often used in metal work where they are known as "drop saws" or more commonly "chop saws".

Because the blade assembly could only pivot, not translate, these initial designs were limited by blade radius in how wide and deep a board they could cut. However, because their capacities were adequate for handling common sizes of dimensional lumber, and because they were more compact and portable than arm and table saws, chop saws quickly became ubiquitous in construction.

Around 1982, the sliding compound miter saw was introduced. This innovation combined all the best features of the compound miter saw with sliding tubes, allowing the cutter head to traverse for a much wider cut. Since then it has become the primary cross cut saw for woodworking, largely supplanting the radial arm saw.

Manufacturers warn of possible electrocution when used near water, or other related saws in close proximity.

== See also ==
- Miter box
- Diamond tool
- Backsaw
- Radial arm saw
- Hack saw
- Table saw
