= Shooting board =

Type of woodworking jig

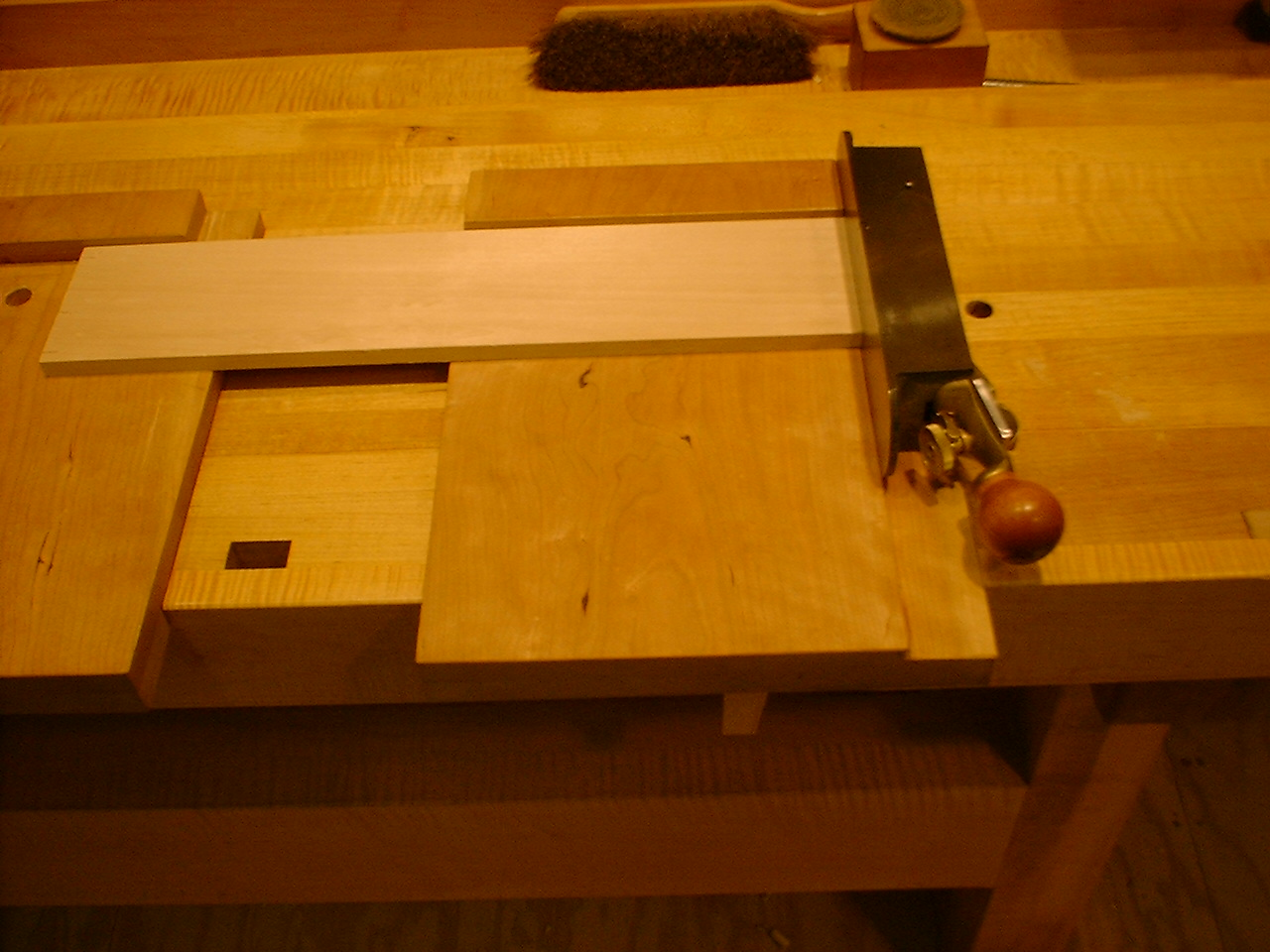
A shooting board used to trim and square end grain

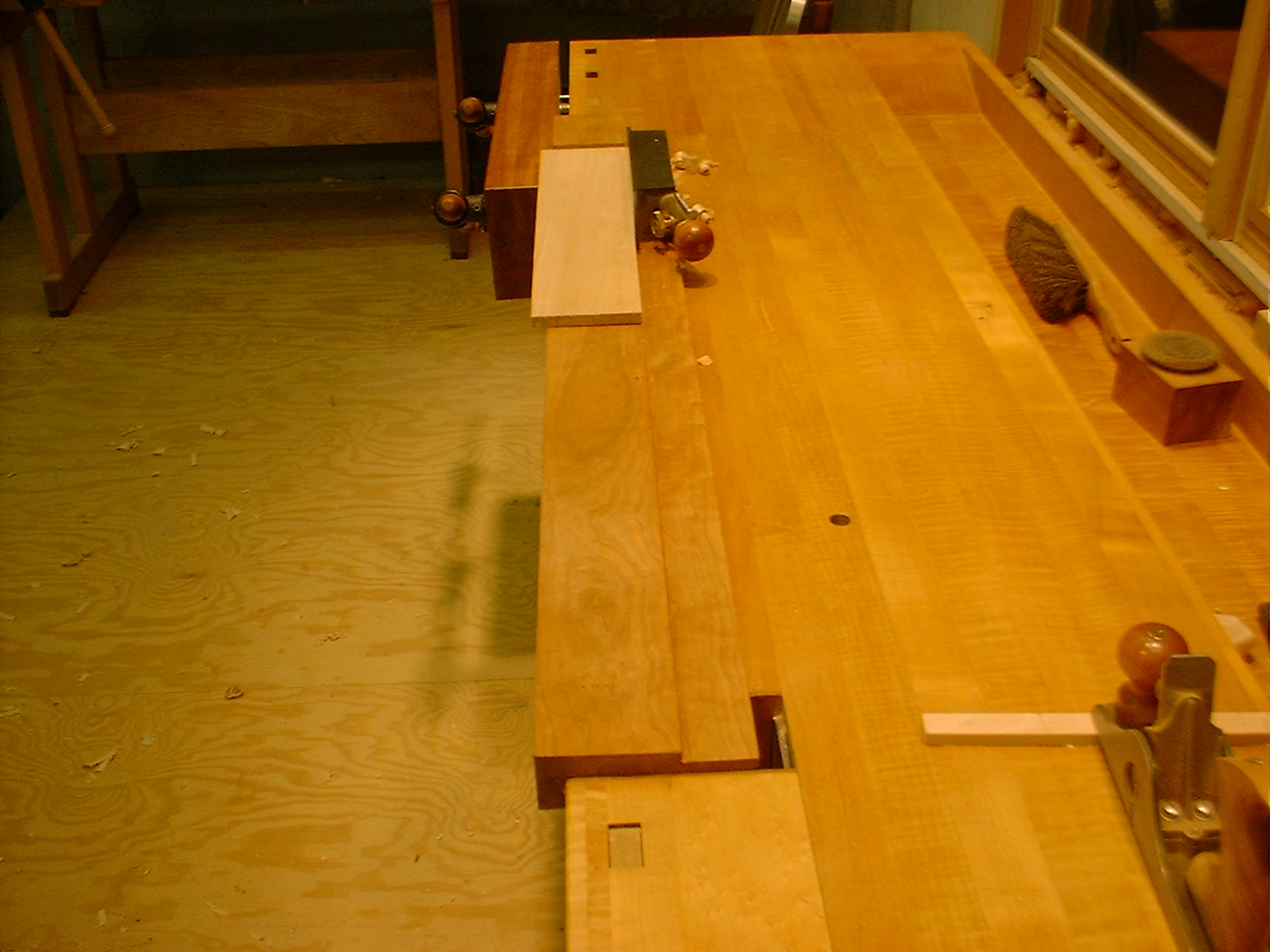
A shooting board used for jointing (end view)

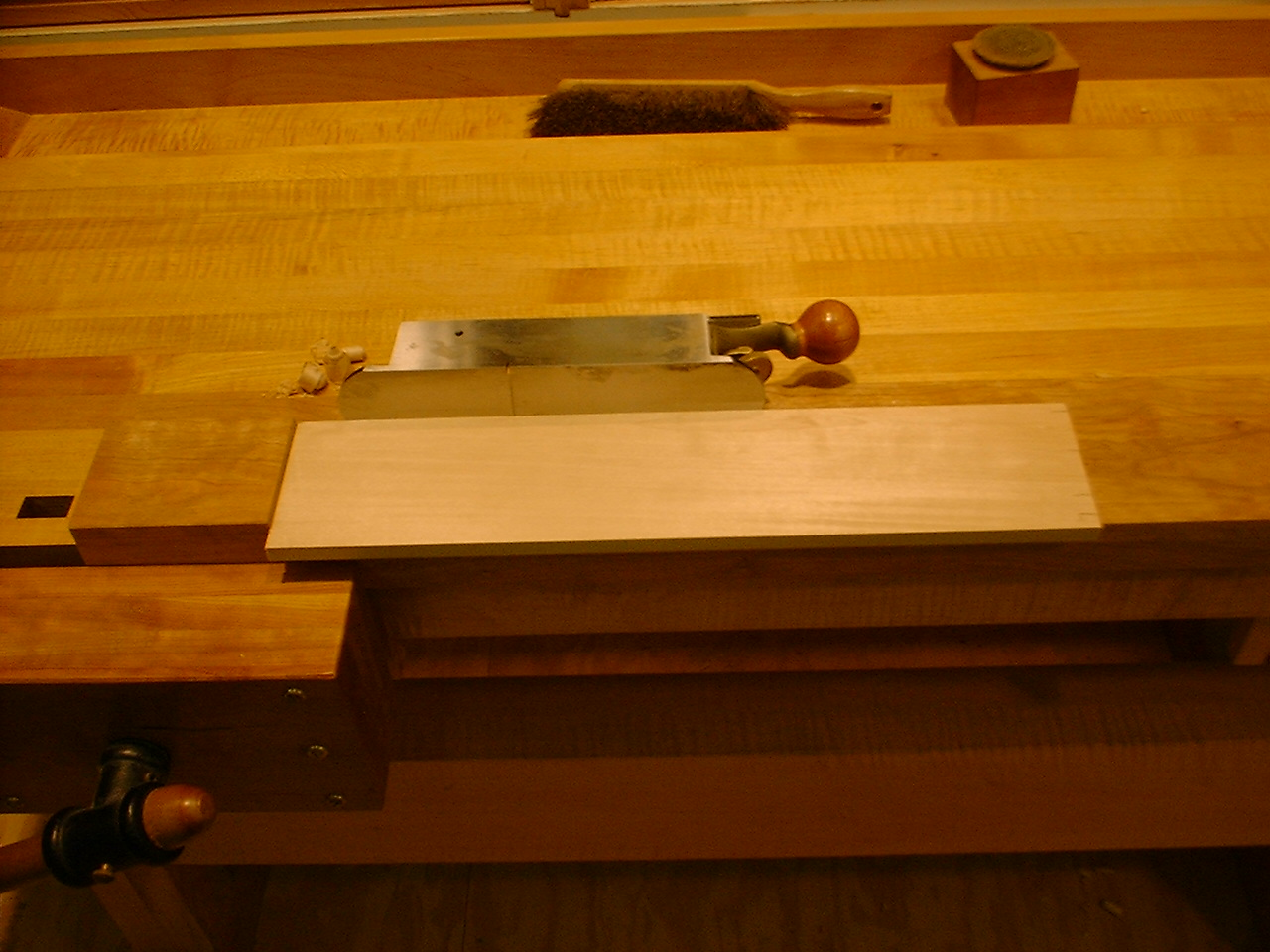
A shooting board used for jointing (side view)

A shooting board is a jig for woodworking which is used in combination with a hand plane to trim and square up the edges and ends of boards. It is typically used on a workbench. A plank or board with edges planed flat is called an edge shooting board.

There are two specific purposes to which shooting boards are applied: jointing and end grain trimming. The design of the shooting board remains fundamentally the same in both cases but the length of the board will vary - with the boards used for jointing being much longer than those intended for end grain trimming.

A shooting board consists of a flat board, the base, with a stop at one end, similar to a bench hook, on which the board to be planed is rested. The stop prevents the board from sliding as it is planed.

Parallel to the base and slightly lower is a secondary surface, the fence, which may be a separate board, or may be a rabbet cut into the base. The difference in height between the base and the fence is to allow for the offset of the blade in the hand plane.

The purpose of the fence is to guide the plane along the edge of the board being planed such that the blade in the plane is presented at 90 degrees to the base of the shooting board. Assuming that the sides of the hand plane being used are perpendicular to the sole, this ensures an edge that is at 90 degrees to the face of the board.

For end grain trimming, the board is placed on the shooting board so that an edge adjacent to the end to be trimmed is hard against the stop. The woodworker will usually have scribed a line on the end to indicate how far to trim the board. The hand plane is rested on its side on the fence and held firmly against the end of the board whilst being pushed along its length. Jointing is performed the same way except that the board is oriented so that one end is against the stop and the edge to be jointed faces the fence.

One problem faced when using shooting boards repetitively is that the blade in the hand plane becomes worn very quickly in one spot. This requires frequent sharpening to ensure smooth and accurate cutting. The ramped shooting board addresses this problem by introducing a slope to the fence. As the hand plane moves along the fence, the slope causes the part of the blade in contact with the board to move along the blade's length. This even exposure of wood along the whole blade allows a longer blade life, as sharpening is less frequent.

Shooting boards can be made in various sizes and shapes to accommodate different tasks and it would not be uncommon to find a number of them in the workshop. One accessory that may be fitted to a shooting board is an angled stop, most commonly at 45 degrees. This allows mitres to be trimmed.
