= Hand saw =

Wood cutting tool

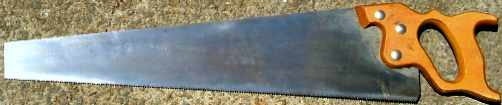
A crosscut hand saw

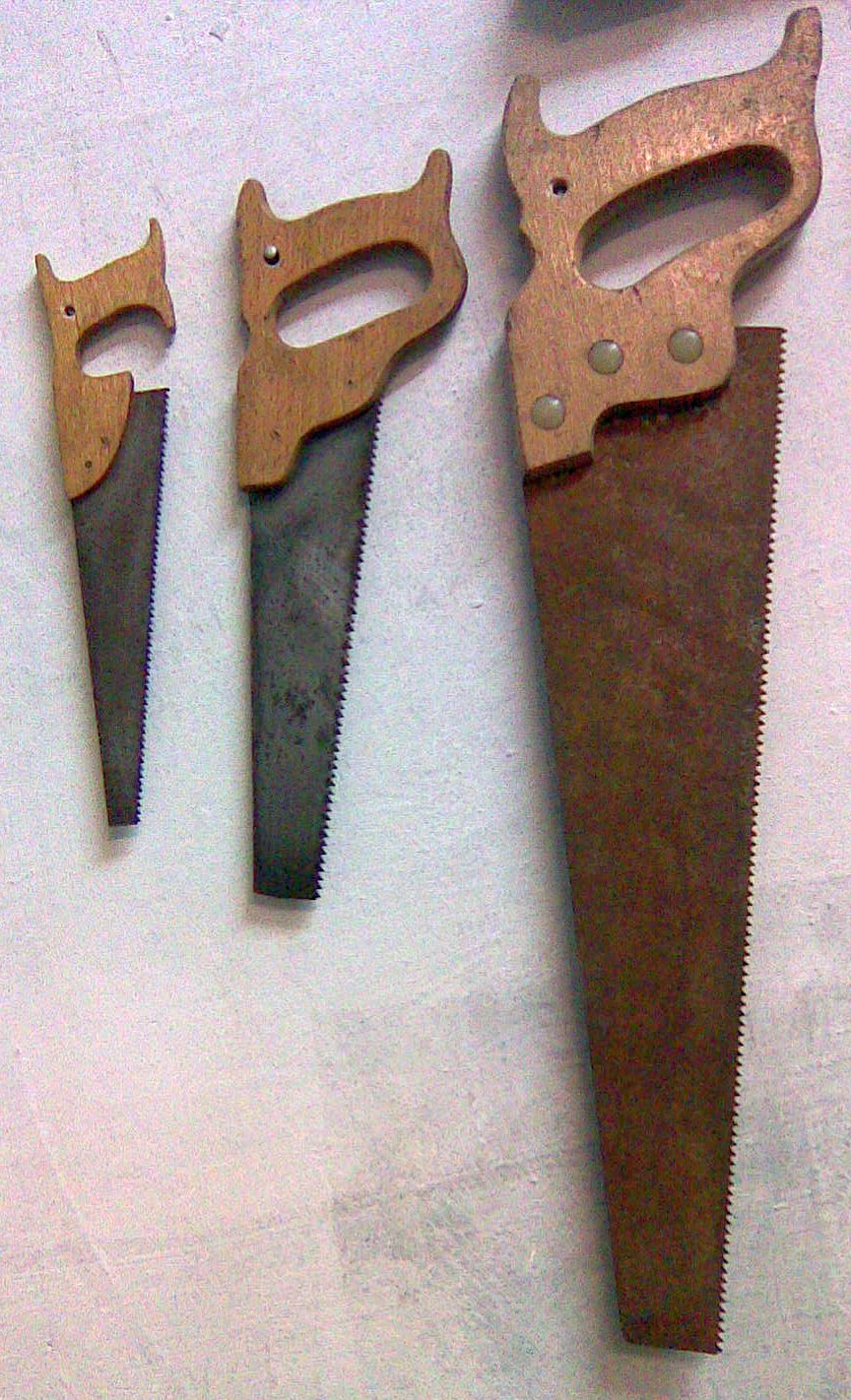
Different sizes of hand saws

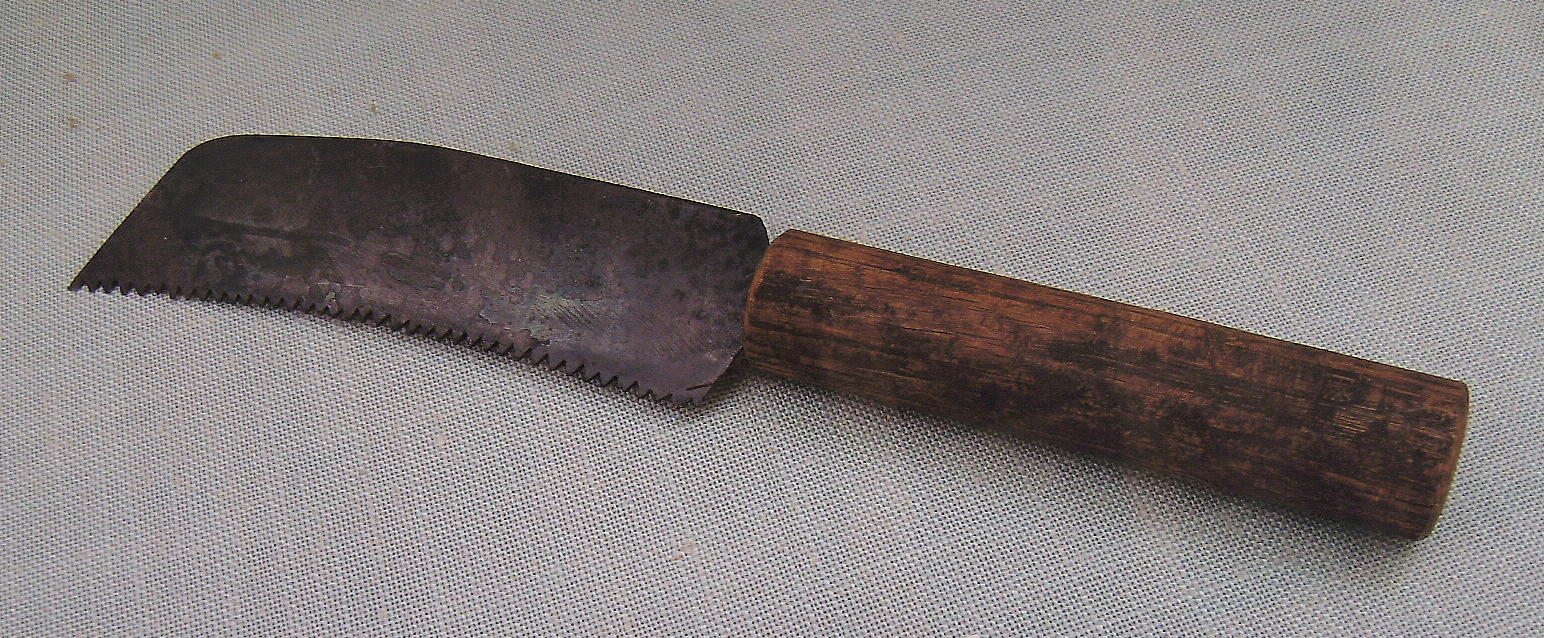
Reconstructed Roman hand saw (1st–3rd century AD)

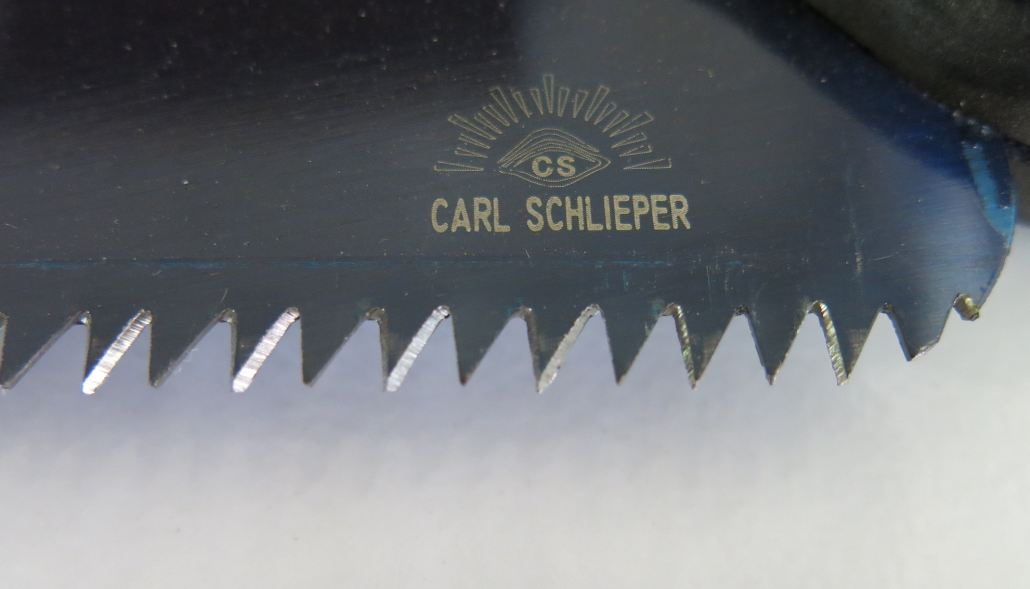
Close view of cross-cut saw teeth

In woodworking and carpentry, hand saws, also known as "panel saws", are used to cut pieces of wood into different shapes. This is usually done in order to join the pieces together and carve a wooden object. They operate by having a series of sharp points, called teeth, of a substance that is harder than the wood being cut.

Hand saws have been used for thousands of years. Egyptian hieroglyphics exist depicting ancient woodworkers sawing boards into pieces, and ancient bow saws have been found in Japan. Cut patterns on ancient boards are occasionally observed to bear the unique cutting marks left by saw blades, particularly if the wood was not 'smoothed up' by some method. Twenty-four saws from eighteenth-century England are currently preserved.

Materials for saw blades have varied over the ages. Bronze saws were likely used before steelmaking technology became extensively known and industrialized.

The most popular material for handles of hand saws is applewood; in the early 1900s 2,000,000 board feet of applewood were used annually for this purpose.

Sometimes cultures developed two main types of saw teeth: the cross cut saw teeth and the rip saw teeth. These cut into the wood using different mechanisms. Crosscut saws have sawteeth that are shaped, often with a metal file, in such a way that they form a series of tiny knife-like edges. Crosscut saws are meant to cut perpendicular, or against, the wood grain. Rip saws, on the other hand, have chisel-like sawteeth and are meant to cut parallel, or with, the grain. Wood fibers are contacted by the teeth and 'ripped' apart from the bundle of other fibers. It is common that people do not recognize the difference and use saws both ways. However, a rip saw is much faster than a cross-cut saw when cutting with the grain but leaves a very rough cut, often with splinters on the surface, and has more difficulty maintaining a straight cut when cutting across the grain. The cross-cut saw can cut in any direction but is much slower than needs be when cutting with the grain.

The development of saws was also affected by several factors. The first was the importance of wood to a society, the development of steel and other saw-making technologies, and the type of power available. These factors were, in turn, influenced by the environment, such as the types of wood or metal available. Finally, the types of jobs the saws were to perform was also important in the development of the technology.

Among Basques and Australians, traditional hand sawing has generated rural sports. The Basque variant is called tronral.

== See also ==
- Saw
- Types of saws
- Musical saws
- Saw set
