= Mitre (disambiguation) =

A mitre is a ceremonial headdress worn by certain religious dignitaries.

Mitre or miter may also refer to:

== Places ==
- Isla Mitre or Lavoisier Island, an island of Antarctica
- Mitre Peninsula, Tierra del Fuego, Argentina
- The Mitre (Alaska), a mountain summit in the Chugach Mountains
- The Mitre (Alberta), a mountain summit in Banff National Park, Canada
- Mitre, New Zealand, a mountain in the North Island
- Mitre Peak (New Zealand), a mountain in the South Island
- Mitre Peak (Canterbury), a mountain in New Zealand
- Mitre Peak, Pakistan
- Mitre Square, London, England, UK

== Businesses ==
- The Mitre, Bayswater, a London pub
- The Mitre, Greenwich, a London pub
- Mitre Corporation, a high technology systems engineering company
- Mitre Line (Buenos Aires), a commuter rail service in Argentina
- Mitre Sports International, a manufacturer of sporting goods, notably footballs
- Museo Mitre, Buenos Aires, a museum dedicated to Argentine history
- Radio Mitre, an Argentine radio station

== People ==
- Bartolomé Mitre (1821–1906), Argentine president, military figure and author
- Engie Mitre (born 1981), Panamanian footballer
- Esmeralda Mitre (born 1982), Argentine actress and businesswoman
- Sergio Mitre (born 1981), American Major League Baseball pitcher
- Santiago Mitre (born 1980), Argentine film director and screenwriter
- Saint Mitre (433–466), Catholic saint

== Other uses ==
- Mitre joint, a type of joint in woodwork or plumbing
  - Mason's mitre, a type of mitre joint
- The Mitre, Newcastle upon Tyne, England, a building
- Mitre (coin), minted in Europe and circulated in Ireland and England
- Mitre cap, a historic military headdress worn by grenadiers and certain other categories of soldier

== See also ==
- Mitre 10, a hardware and timber retailer in Australia
- Mitre 10 (New Zealand), a hardware and timber retailer in New Zealand
- Mitre box, a tool for guiding a saw to make mitre cuts
- Mitre saw, a saw for making mitre joints
- Miter square, a tool for marking and checking angles
- Mitred bend, a type of bend in a microstrip
