= Gripe =

Gripe may refer to:

- Arena Gripe, an indoor sporting arena located in Split, Croatia
- Gripe, Split, an administrative division of Split, Croatia
- Gripe water, a product sold to relieve colic and other gastrointestinal ailments and discomforts of infants
- Gripe site, a type of website devoted to the critique and or mockery of a person, place, politician, corporation, or institution
- Gripe (Ninjago), character in Ninjago
- Gripe (tool), a simple form of clamp used in building a clinker boat

== People ==
- Maria Gripe (a.k.a. Maja Stina Walter, 1923–2007), a Swedish author of books for children and young adults
- Ragnar Gripe (1883–1942), a Swedish sailor who competed in the 1912 Summer Olympics
