= C-clamp (stagecraft) =

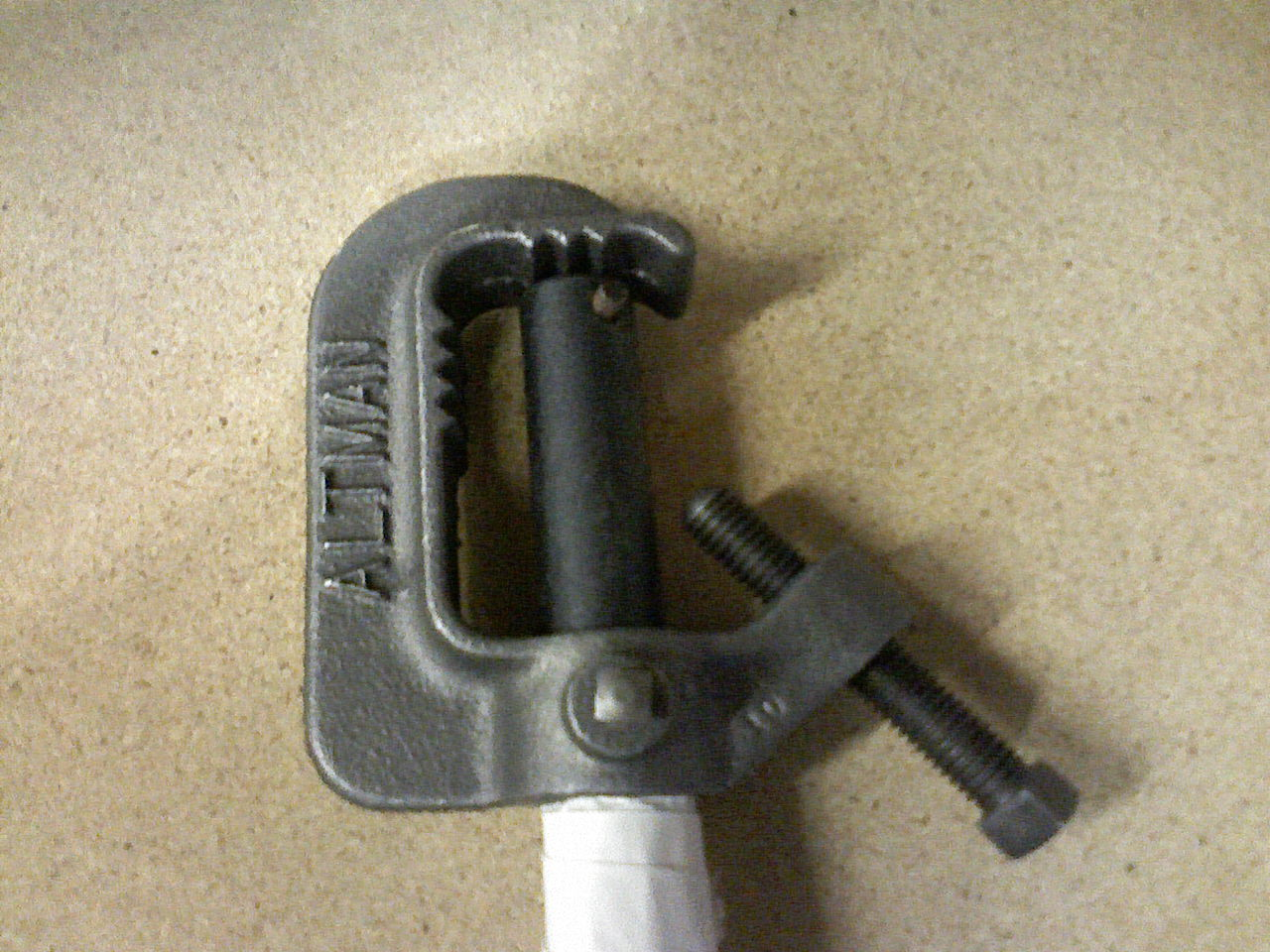
A C-Clamp manufactured by Altman Stage Lighting for use on their lighting instruments. Note the square-headed pan screw on the shaft of the clamp.

In stagecraft, a c-clamp can refer to a number of different pieces of hardware, depending on its intended use.

== Lighting and sound ==
In stage lighting and sound a c-clamp, also referred to as a pipe clamp, is used to attach a larger piece of hardware, such as a lighting instrument, a speaker, or a dimmer, to a pipe or batten. Newer c-clamps tend to be constructed of aluminum, although steel is also available.

C-clamps function by affixing a bolt (the "shaft bolt") to the hardware they are to hold in place, such as through the yoke of a lighting instrument, and securely fastening this bolt to the clamp shaft. The open end of the clamp is then placed over the batten, and a bolt (the "clamp bolt") is tightened to secure the c-clamp. C-clamps for stage lighting fixtures usually also have a pan screw (also known as a "grub bolt"), which when loosened will allow the clamp shaft, and therefore the fixture, to be rotated 360 degrees while maintaining a secure connection to the batten.

=== Parts ===
- Clamp: the main body of the clamp, is typically either cast steel or aluminium and designed to sit overtop of a typical theatrical batten.
- Clamp Bolt: a long-threaded bolt (typically 9/16") designed to tighten down on a pipe, forcing it into the clamp.
- Spigot: a machined metal shaft that sits in the clamp and rotates freely through 360°. Used for attaching Stage lighting instrument or other fixture to the c-clamp.
- Pan Bolt: A small bolt through the side of the clamp, typically 1/4" or 3/8" which tightens down onto the spigot, preventing it from rotating (panning).
- Yoke Bolt: A short 1/2" bolt which affixes the yoke of a fixture to the spigot.

=== Variations ===
- Pipe Clamp
- C clamp
- Trigger Clamp
- Cheeseborough / swivel coupler / double coupler and half-burger / half coupler
- Manfrotto Super Clamp
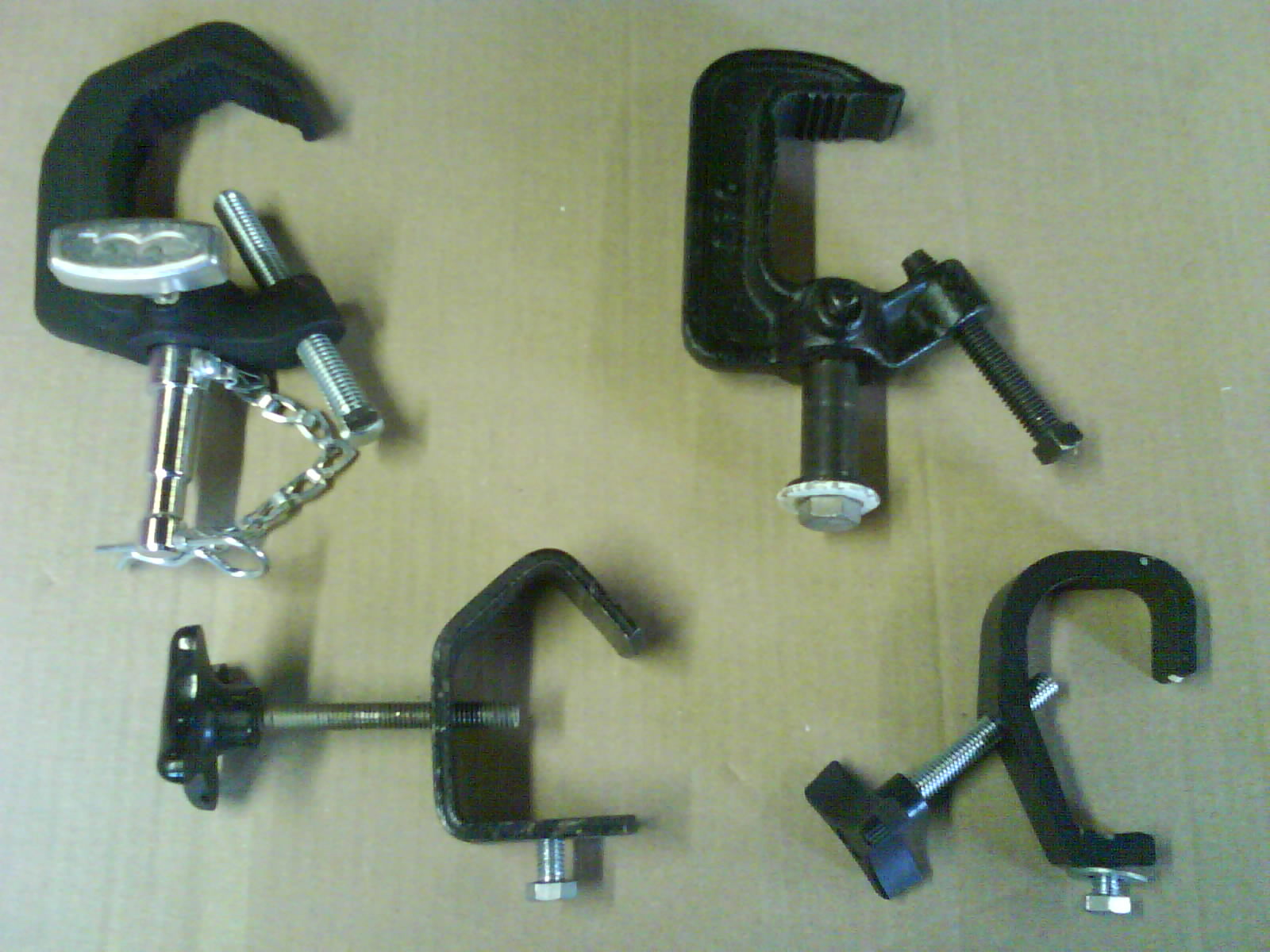
Assorted clamps, from top left: A baby pipe clamp, c-clamp, g-clamp, light duty c-clamp (sometimes called a "J" clamp).

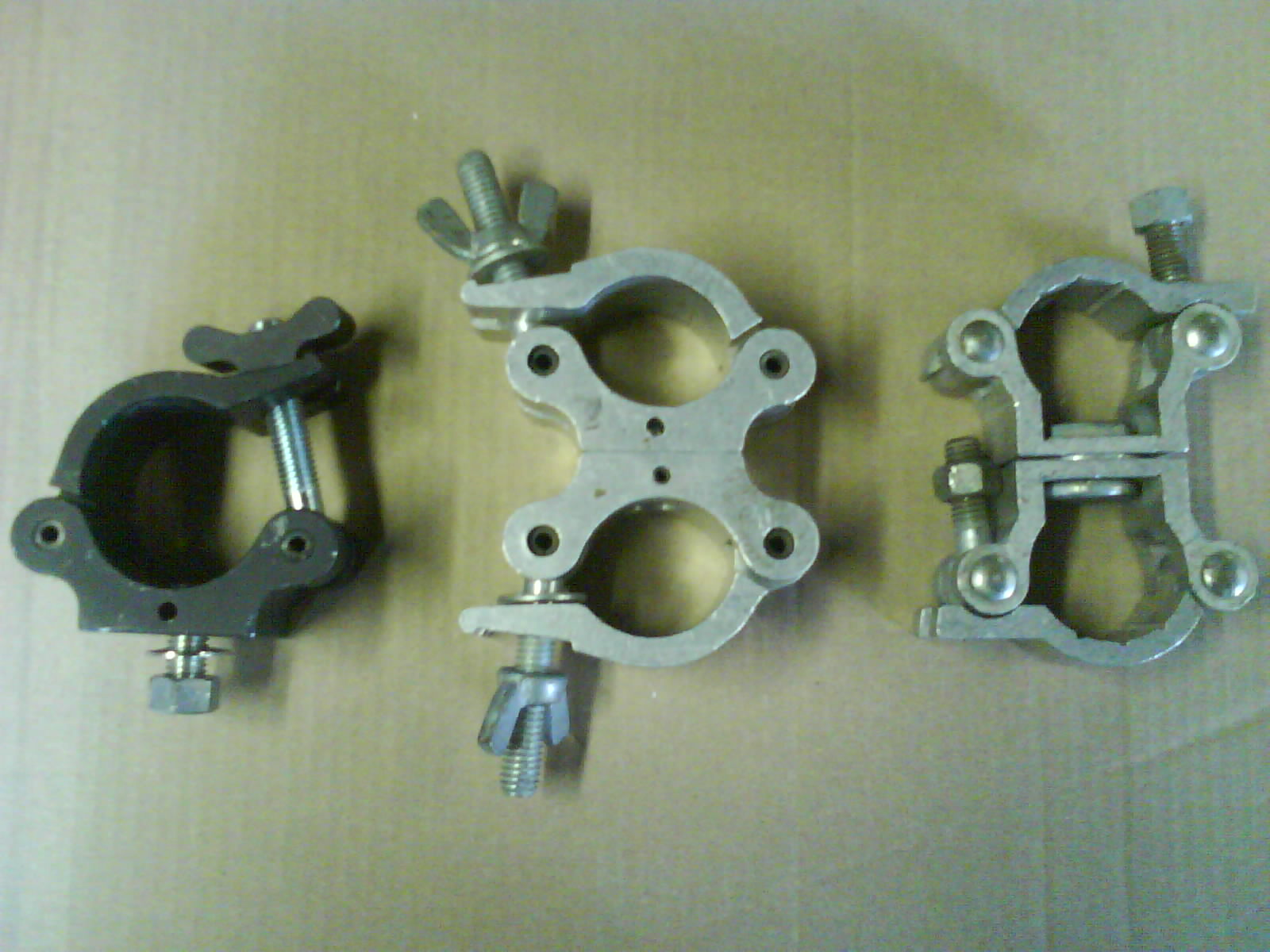
Assorted cheeseboroughs, from left: A half, swivel, scaffold clamp.

== Film and television ==
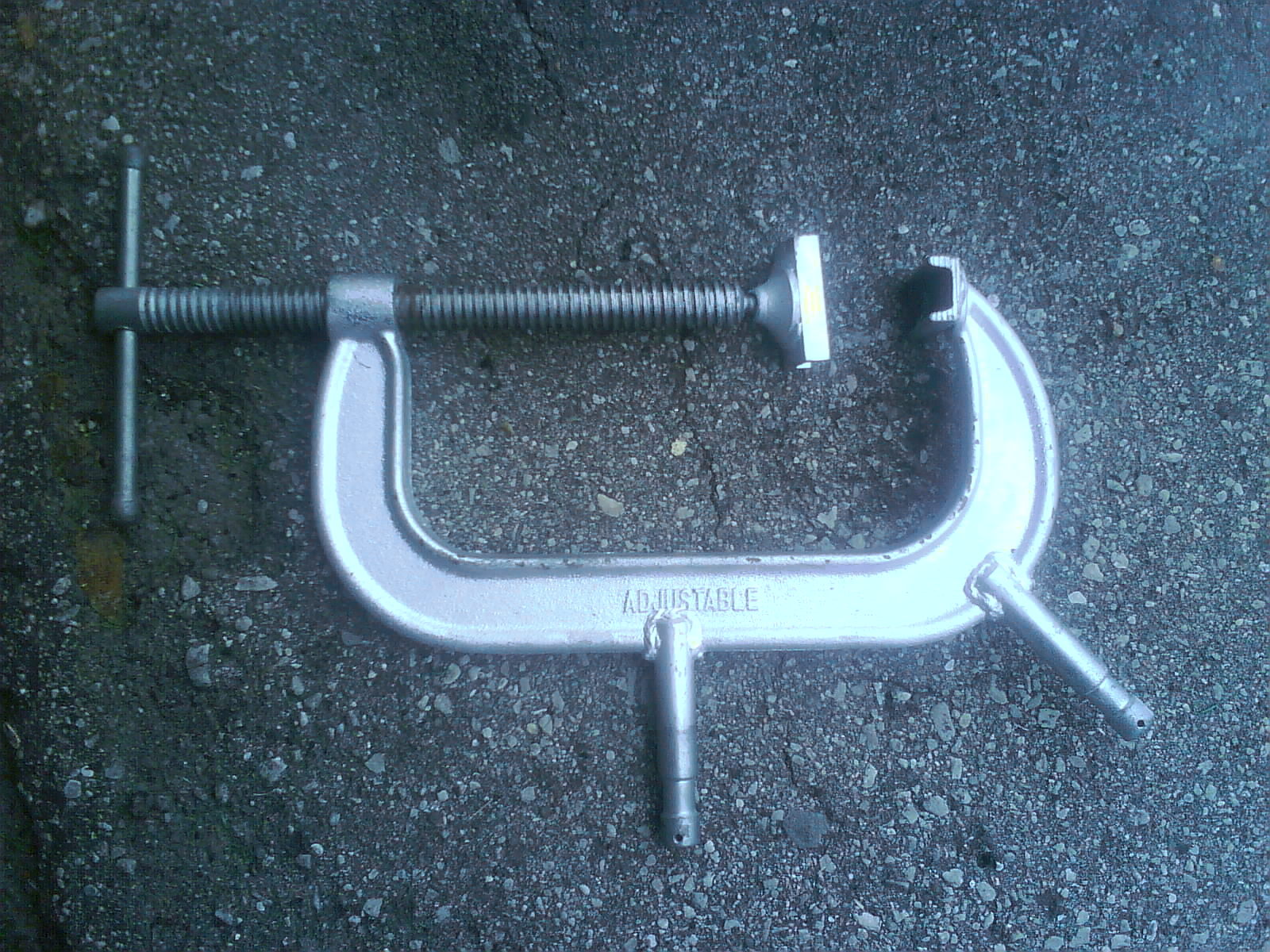
A C-clamp manufactured with studs for affixing television lighting fixtures.

Film and television grips commonly make use of c-clamps that are manufactured specifically for their industry. These clamps are produced with integrated studs designed to accept the mounting hardware from a variety of small, lightweight lighting fixtures, allowing illumination to be placed in unusual or awkward locations quickly and easily.

== Theatrical carpentry ==
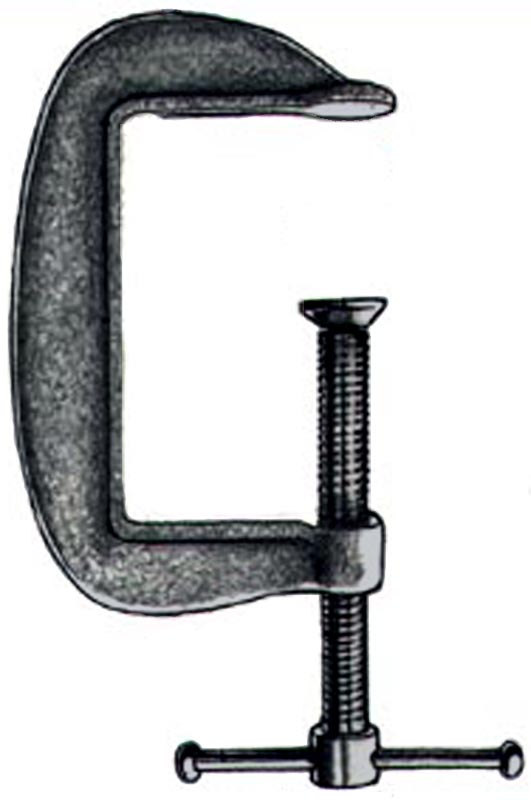
A woodworking C-clamp

C-clamps are commonly used in theatrical carpentry for the same purpose that non-theatrical carpenters employ them: for creating a quick, temporary, and non-destructive way of joining two objects together. Legs are commonly attached to platforms via c-clamp before they are fastened together using a more permanent method (i.e. bolts). Multi-platform assemblies are also commonly joined to one another solely with c-clamps, especially in touring situations where a set needs to be assembled and struck quickly.

== See also ==
- Clamp (tool)
