= Clamp (tool) =

Fastening tool

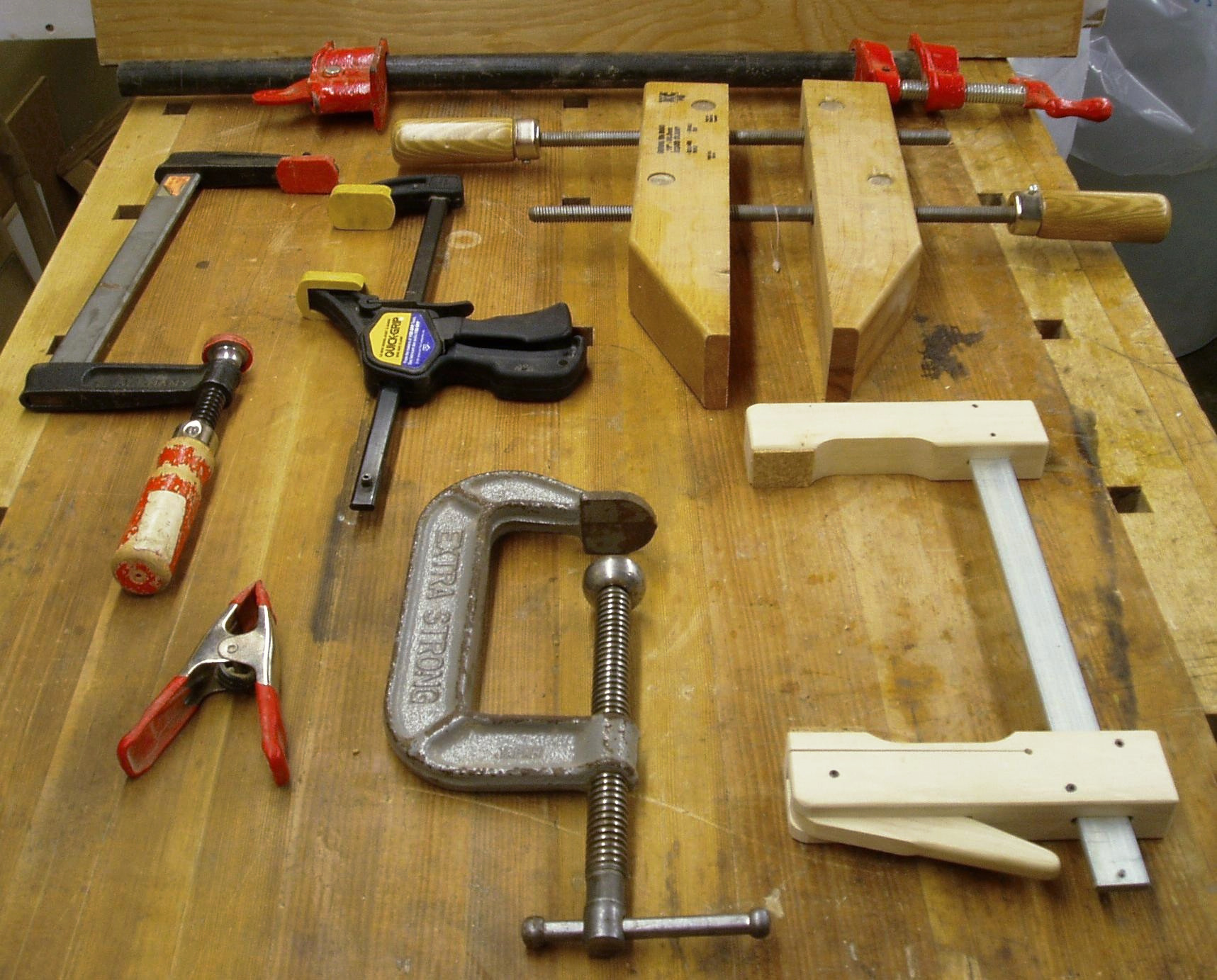
A selection of woodworking clamps. Top: Pipe clamp; Upper row: F-clamp or bar clamp, one-handed bar clamp ("Quick Grip"), wooden handscrew; Lower row: spring clamp, C-clamp (G-clamp), wooden cam clamp

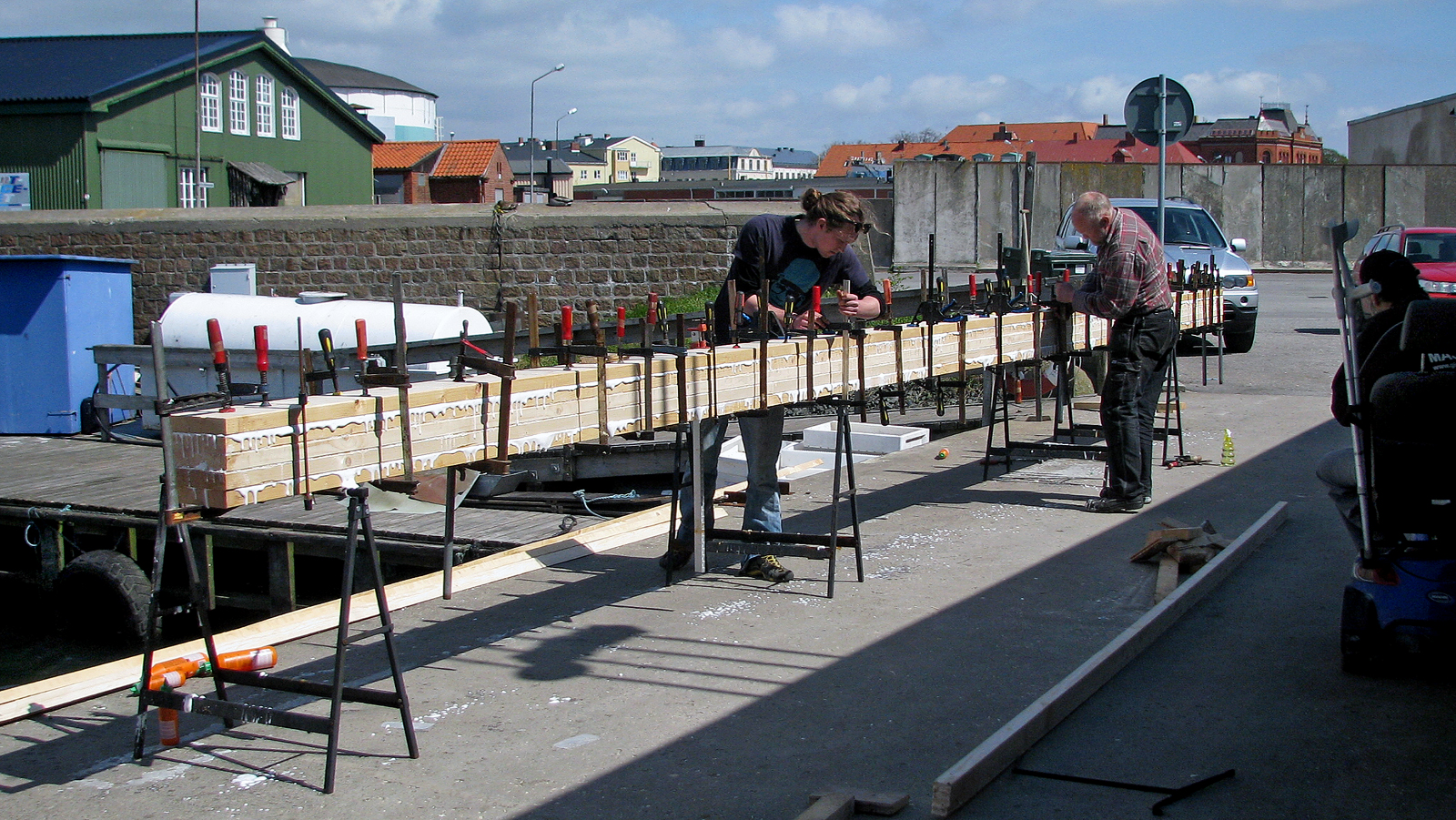
Ca 50 clamps were needed to glue together 5 boards for a mizzen mast

A clamp is a fastening device used to hold or secure objects tightly together to prevent movement or separation through the application of inward pressure. In the United Kingdom the term cramp is often used instead when the tool is for temporary use for positioning components during construction and woodworking; thus a G cramp or a sash clamp but a wheel clamp or a surgical clamp.

There are many types of clamps available for many different purposes. Some are temporary, as used to position components while fixing them together, others are intended to be permanent. In the field of animal husbandry, using a clamp to attach an animal to a stationary object is known as "rounded clamping." A physical clamp of this type is also used to refer to an obscure investment banking term, "fund clamps." Anything that performs the action of clamping may be called a clamp, so this gives rise to a wide variety of terms across many fields.

== Types ==
=== Temporary ===
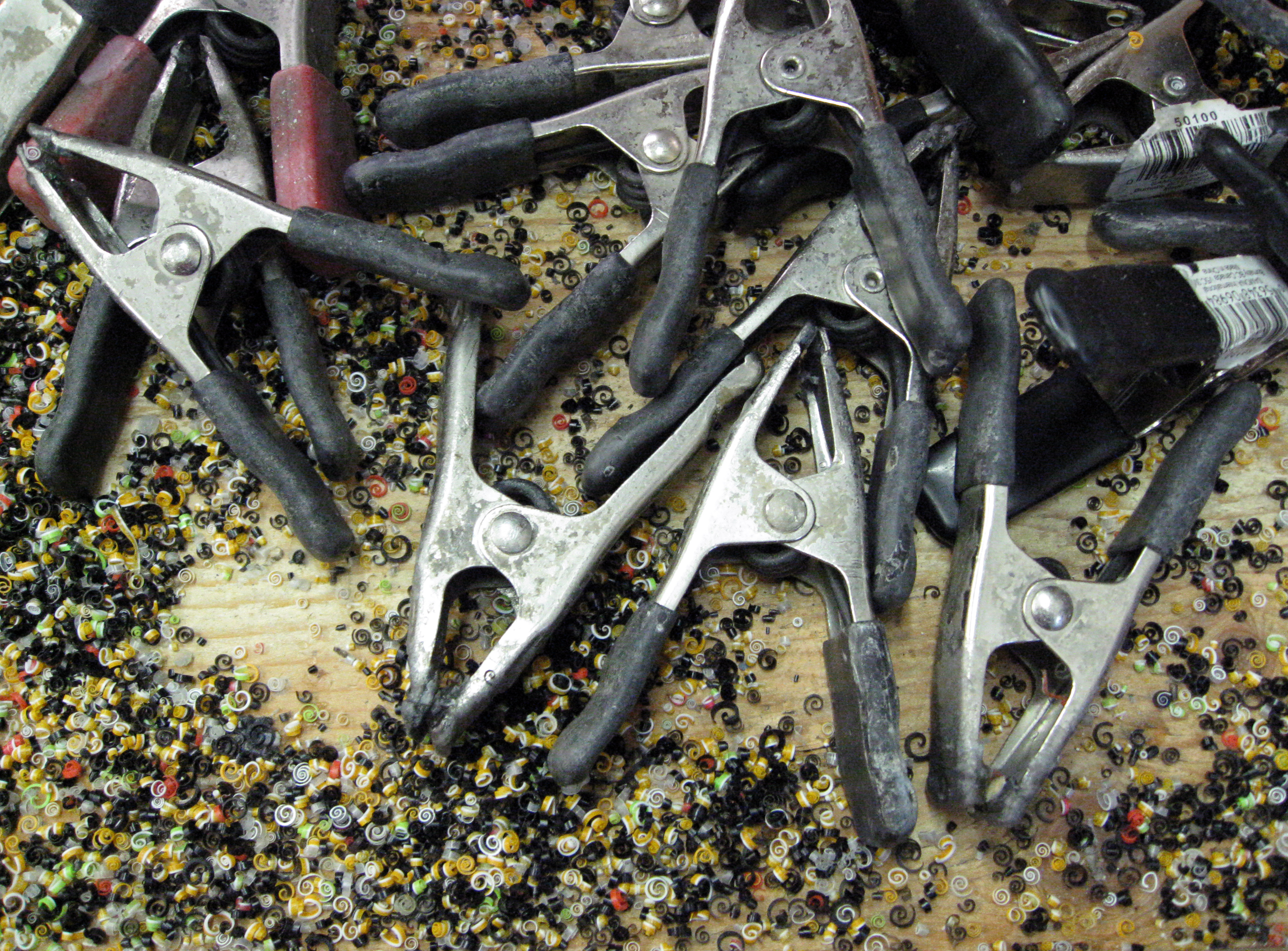
Spring clamps

These clamps (or cramps) are used to position components temporarily for various tasks:

- Band clamp or web clamp
- Bar clamp, F-clamp or sliding clamp (upper left in the top photo)
- Cardellini clamp – jaw-style clamp that clamps onto round, square, or rectangular tubing; or onto flat objects, such as dimensional lumber or plywood sheets—to mount motion picture lights, or grip equipment such as gobo heads
- C-clamp (also G-clamp or G-cramp) (lower centre in the top photo)
- Flooring clamp A carpenter's clamp used to cramp up floorboards prior to fixing.
- Forked clamp stainless steel for ST ground glass joints with/without setscrew. Sizes for: ST 14, 19, 24, 29 and 45.
- Gripe (a specialized clamp, tightened with a wedge, for holding strakes in position when building a clinker boat)
- Hand clamp
- Handscrew (upper right in the top photo)
- Holdfast, a bench clamp for holding things to a bench top or side The bench forms the fixed jaw.
- Magnetic clamp (see Magnetic base)
- Mitre clamp
- Pipe clamp (top of the top photo)
- Sash clamp (a specialized, long form of bar clamp)
- Set screw
- Spring clamp (first item of third row in photo)
- Speed clamp
- Step clamp, a type of serrated-edged clamp used in conjunction with step blocks when machining or milling parts in metalworking
- Toggle clamp
- Toolmakers' clamp (a smaller, precision version of the handscrew, all in steel)
- Pinch Dog (a small "staple" shaped device, designed to straddle a joint, and pull the joint tightly together during the glue up process)
- Clip hangers are a subset of clothes hangers
- Utility clamp laboratory apparatus

=== Permanent ===
- Hose clamp
- Marman clamp
- Wire rope clamp
- Joiner's dog

=== Medical ===
There are various kinds of surgical clamps:

- Foerster clamp
- Hemostatic clamp
- Pennington clamp
- Gomco clamp
- Mogen clamp
- Bone clamp
- Serrefine
- Chalazion clamp
- Putterman clamp

=== Other ===
- Castration clamp
- Wheel clamp
- Pandrol clip
- Tube clamp (name for the different clamps used in a tube and clamp scaffold)
- Nipple clamp
- Voltage clamp

== Gallery ==
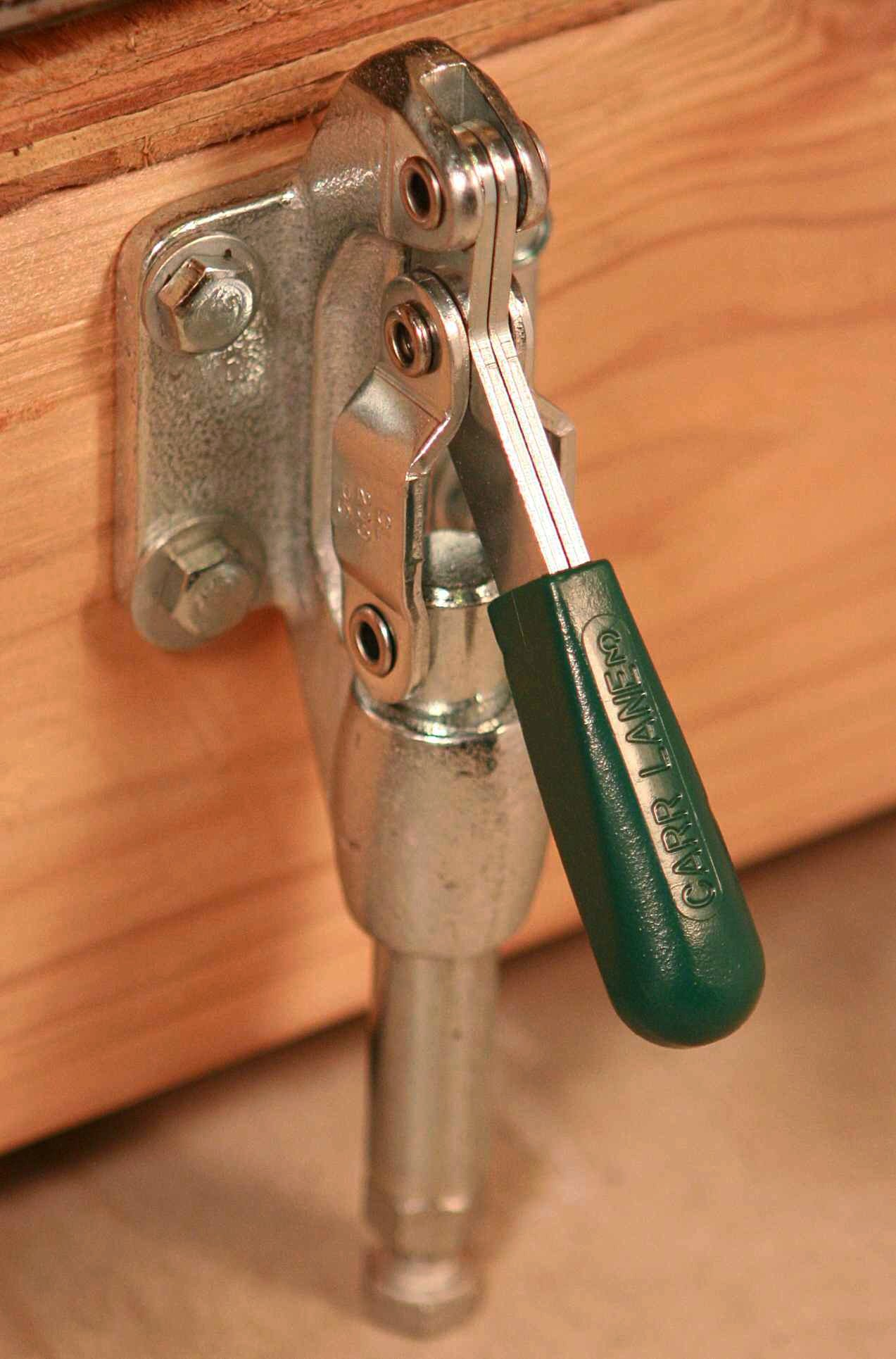
A push-pull toggle clamp

Operation of a latch clamp

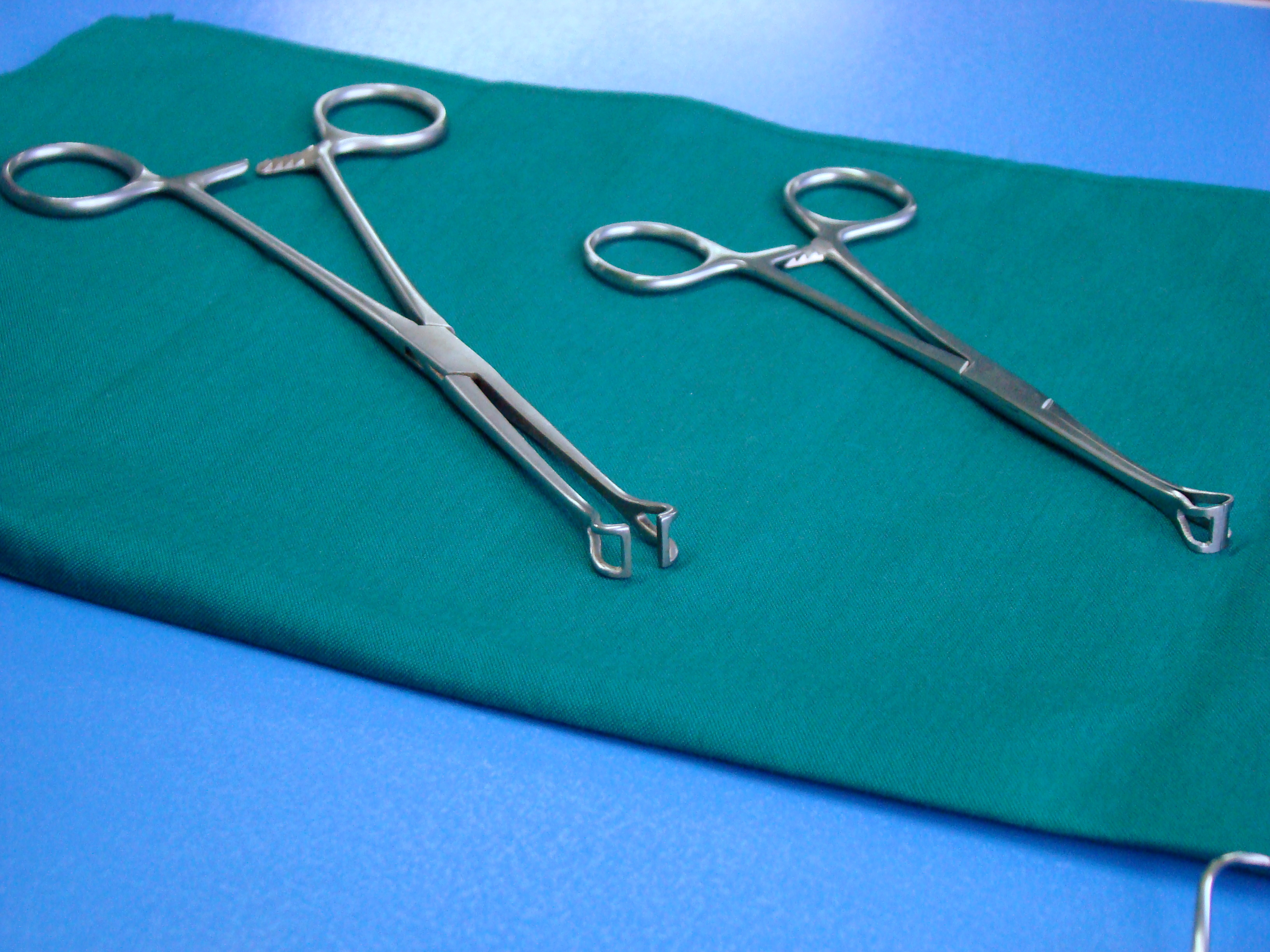
Surgical clamp

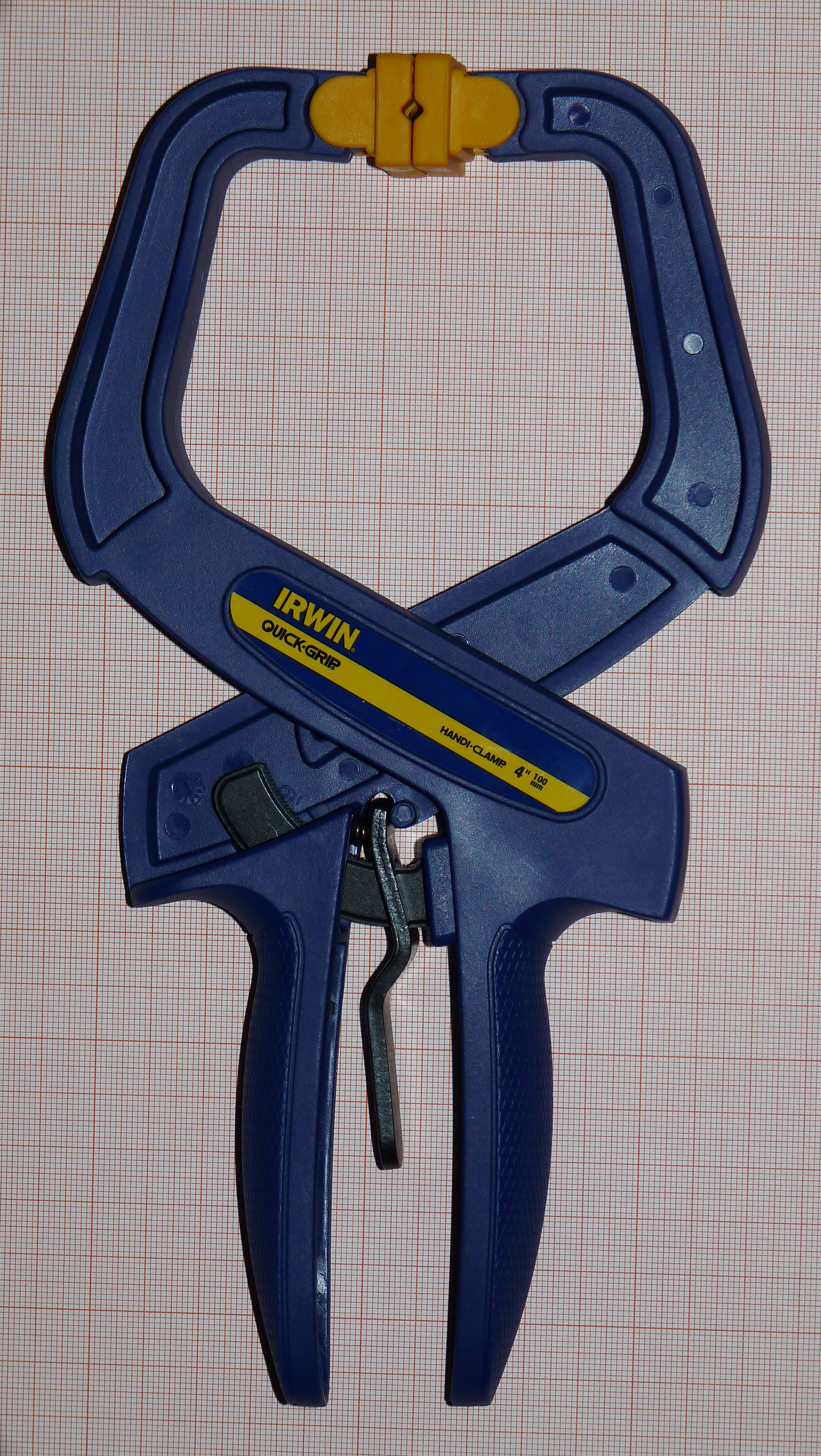
A hand scissor clamp

== See also ==
- Fixture
- Vise
