= Miter clamp =

Clamp designed to hold mitre joints together

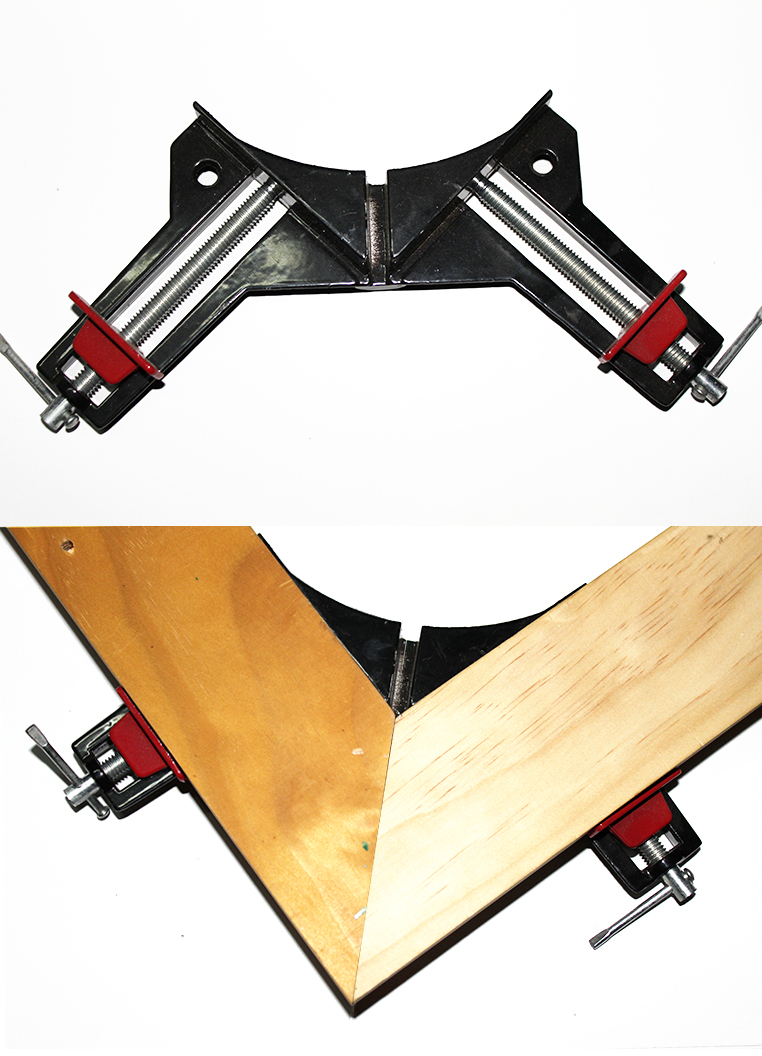
A mitre clamp alone (top) and holding wood (bottom).

Mitre clamps or miter clamps are clamps designed to hold mitre joints together.

== History ==
The earliest mitre clamps are a simple spring in a C-shape with sharpened points that are sprung onto the outside corner of the mitre joint.

In a later design, right angled plates are higher than the screws and the holder. The screws go under the frame (work-piece) to be held, and the bit clamps down on the lower-edge of the frame.

Recent designs are more complicated; a rigid body holds one fixed and one moveable jaw activated by a cam. An example of newer clamps is Jim Chestnut's Clam Clamp.
