= Step clamp =

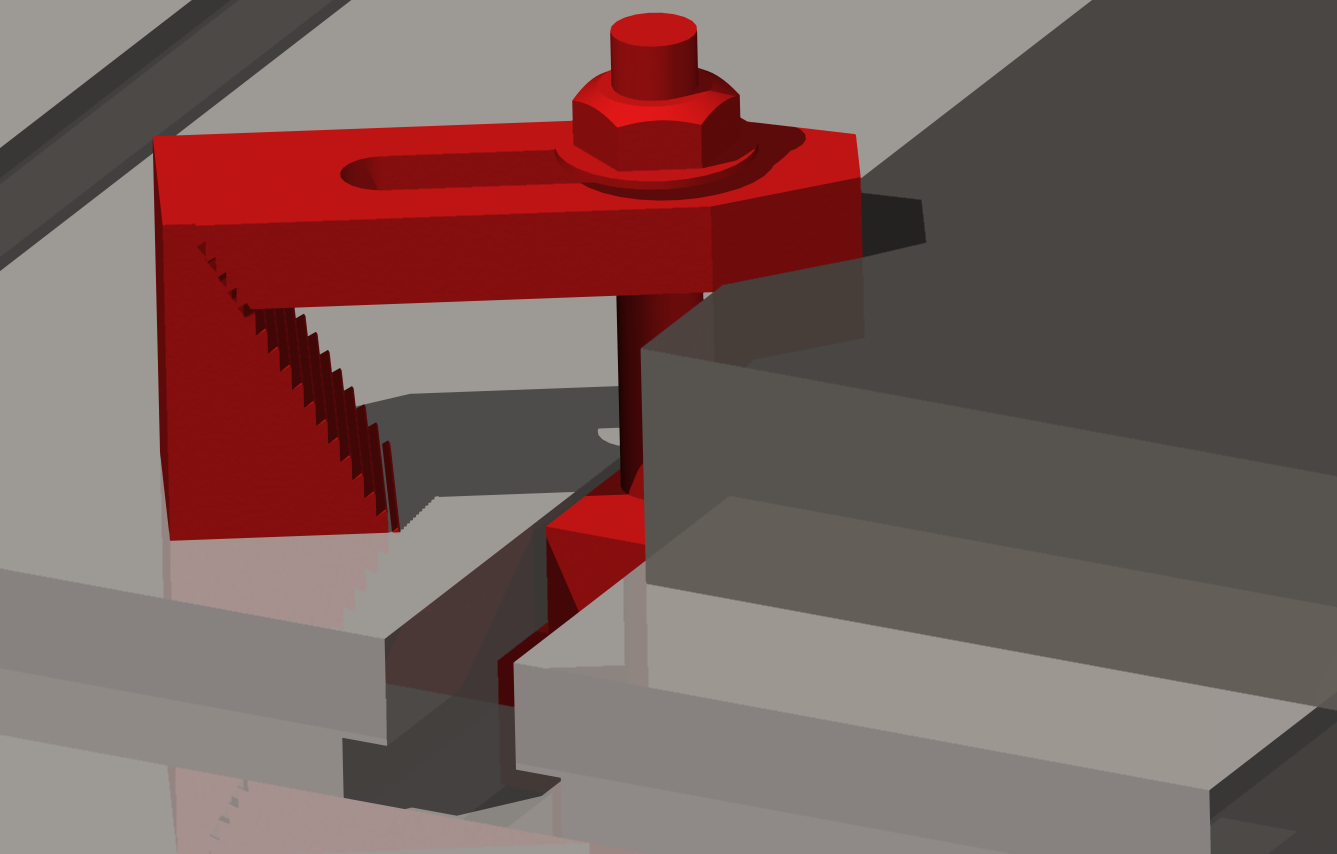
- Step block and clamp installed in a T-slot table.

A step clamp is a type of serrated-edged clamp used in conjunction with step blocks in machining to fix an object in place during milling operations.

They are available from numerous manufacturers such as Dinli, Misumi, etc.
