= Pipe clamp =

Type of tool

A pipe clamp is a type of clamp often employed in piping, woodworking, and cabinet shops.

Pipe clamps for woodwork or cabinet shops are usually composed of commercially manufactured clamp heads or "jaws" and a length of common threaded pipe. The capacity of the clamp is determined by the length of the pipe used.

When referring to piping, pipe clamps are used to connect the pipe to the pipe hanger assembly.

== Pipe clamps in woodwork ==
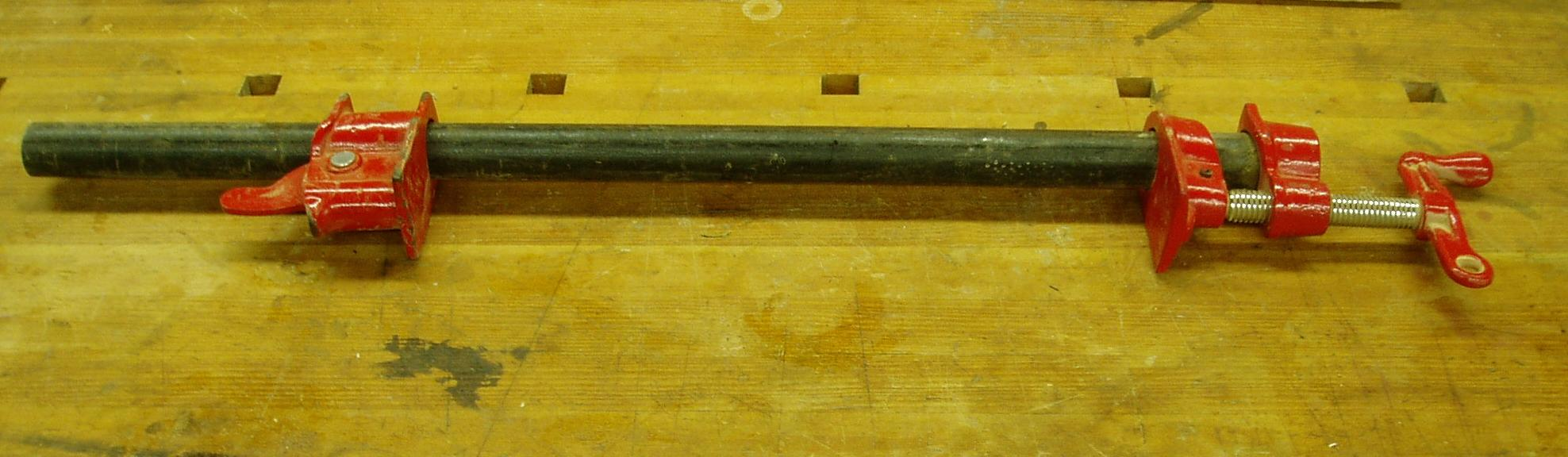
A short pipe clamp

In woodwork, a pipe clamp uses clamp heads produced commercially by numerous manufacturers. They are available in various diameter sizes, commonly ½”or ¾”, suited to the same diameter piping. The pipe is usually threaded on both ends. One head is fixed on the pipe by spinning it onto standard pipe threads. This head includes the screw mechanism for tightening the clamp. The other, movable, head slides onto the other end of the pipe. This head has a mechanism, often a series of movable “clutches” which allow it to slide along the pipe when setting up the clamping operation but which lock onto the pipe when clamping pressure is applied.

Pipe clamps serve a similar purpose to bar clamps but are generally less expensive to purchase and have a versatility derived from the ability to use a variety of lengths of pipe to suit one's needs. The same clamp heads might be switched over from a two-foot length of pipe to a twelve-foot length as the project at hand dictates. Having threads at both ends of the pipe also allows the use of pipe couplings, joining two lengths of pipe to extend the length of the clamp.

=== Uses ===
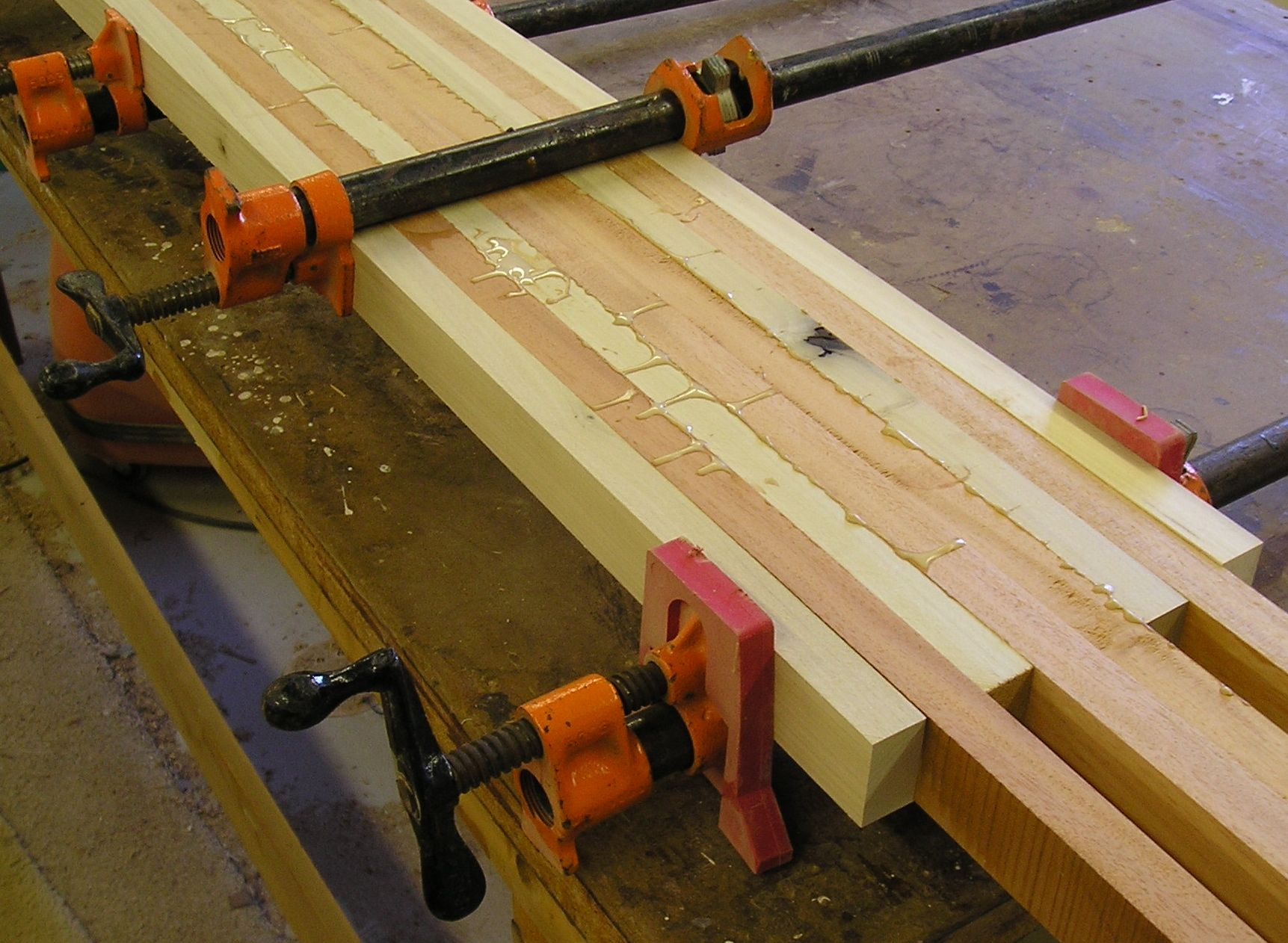
Pipe clamps being used to glue up a wooden lamination.

A common use of pipe clamps in woodworking is for edge gluing; several boards being joined edge to edge to produce a wider surface such as a table top or cabinet components. In this case several pipe clamps will be set up on the workbench so that clamping pressure can be applied evenly along the length of the boards being joined. Pipe clamps can be used to assemble the four sides of boxes or cabinets. As with most other forms of clamps, a wide variety of uses might be found.

== Pipe clamps in piping ==
In piping, a pipe clamp is a bottled attachment that clamps around the pipe. The clamps can be manufactured with black or galvanized finishes.
