= Dovetail joint =

Woodworking joinery technique

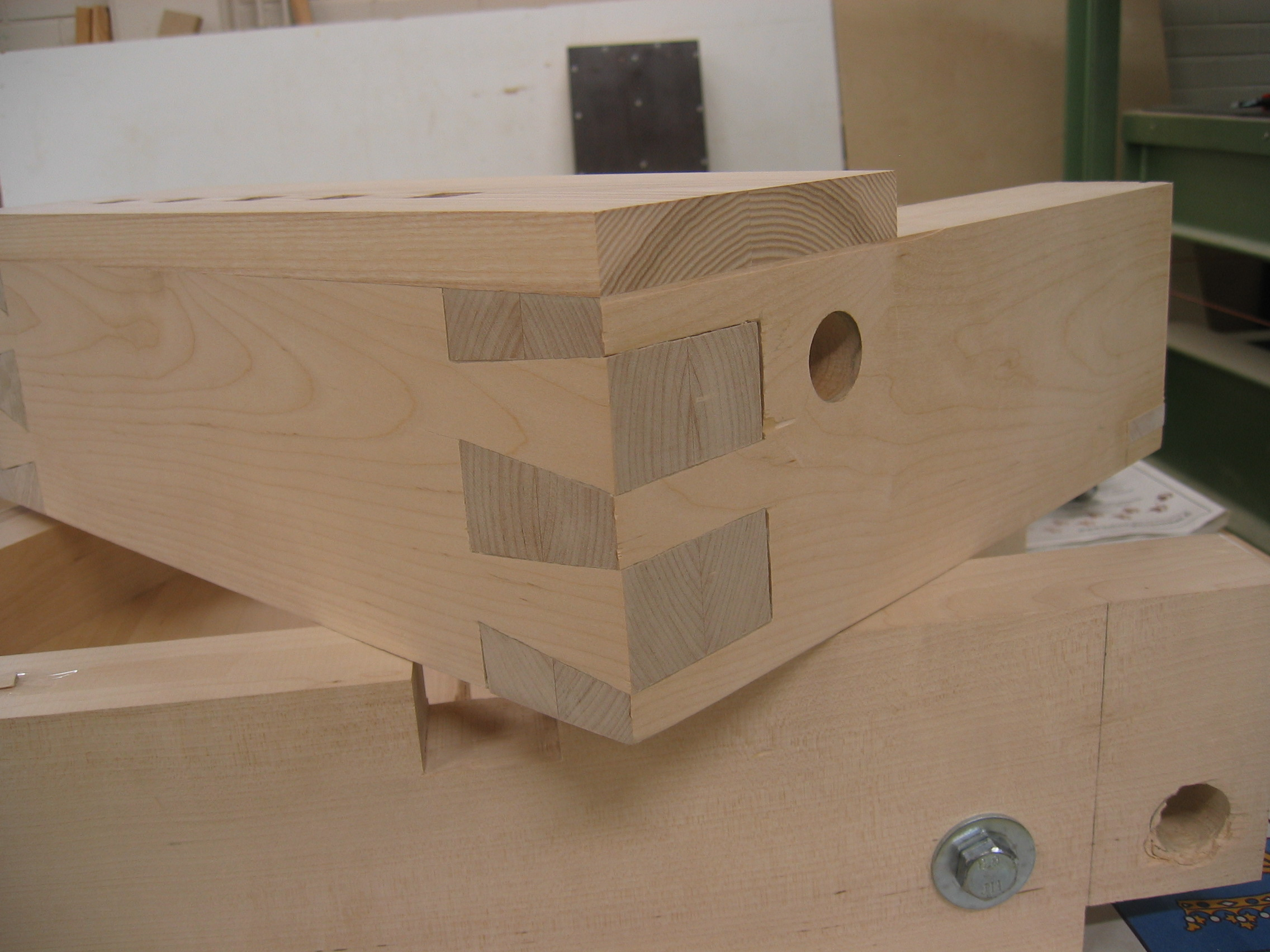
A finished dovetail joint

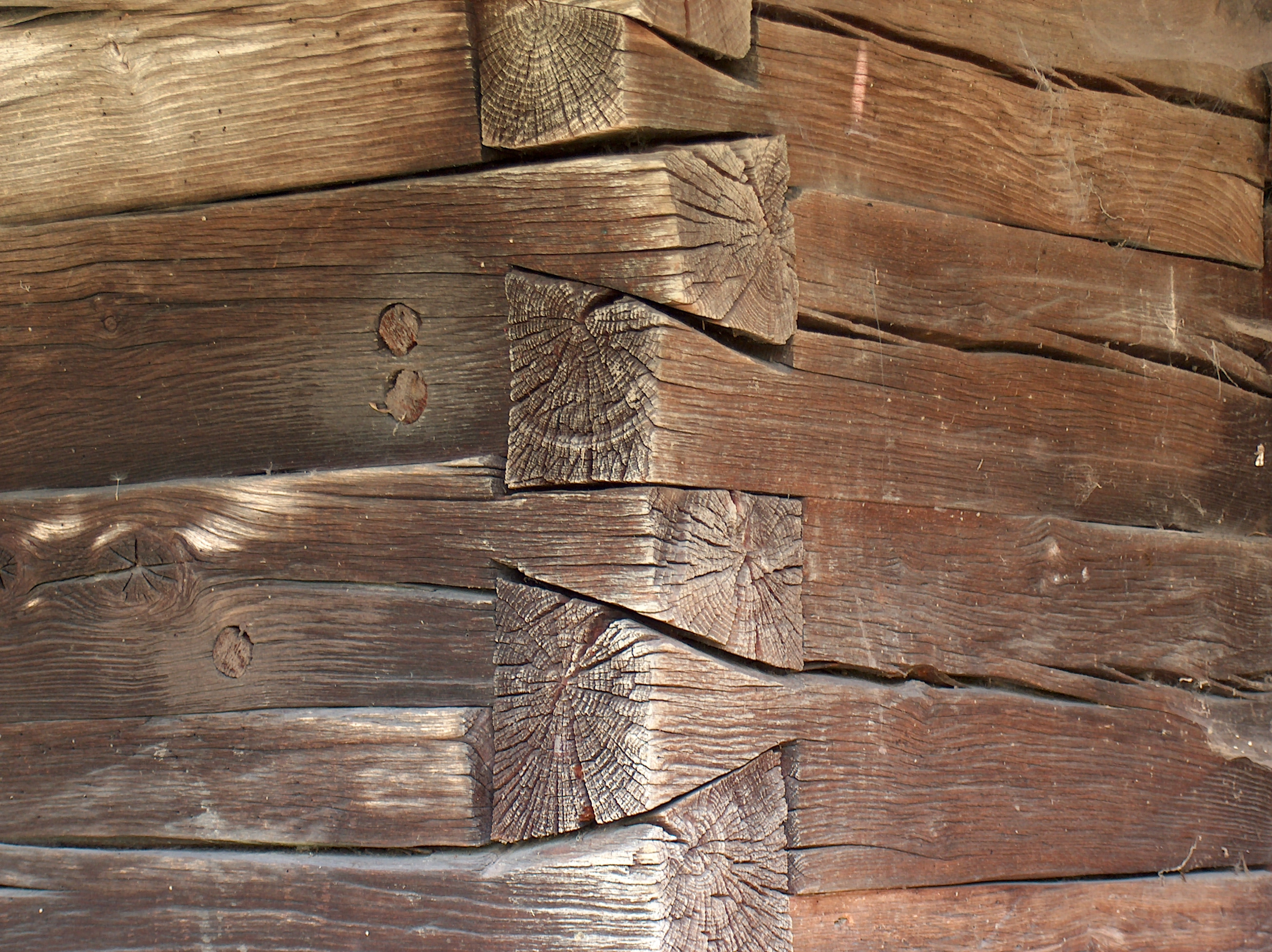
Dovetailed woodworking joints on a Romanian church

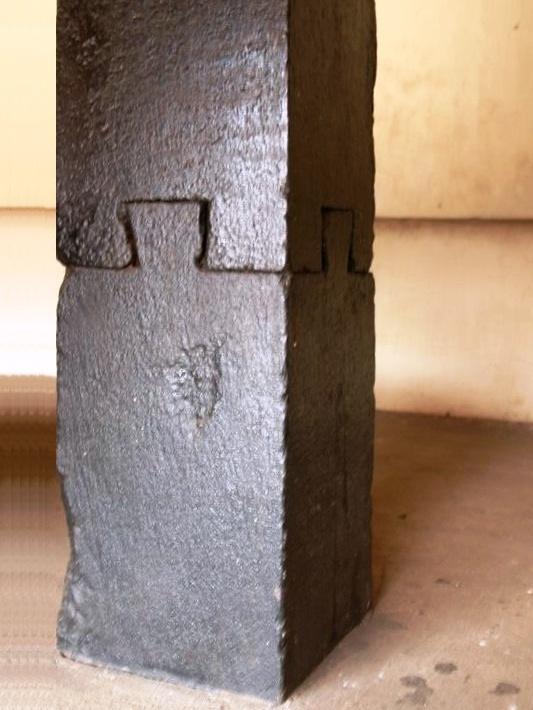
Stone pillar at the Vazhappally Maha Siva Temple

A dovetail joint (also dovetail, or in Europe a swallowtail, culvertail or fantail joint) is a joinery technique most commonly used in woodworking joinery (carpentry), including furniture, cabinets, log buildings, and traditional timber framing. Noted for its resistance to being pulled apart, also known as tensile strength, the dovetail joint is commonly used to join the sides of a drawer to the front. A series of pins cut to extend from the end of one board interlock with a series of 'tails' cut into the end of another board. The pins and tails have a trapezoidal shape. Once glued, a wooden dovetail joint requires no mechanical fasteners.

== History ==
The dovetail joint technique probably pre-dates written history. Some of the earliest known examples of the dovetail joint are in ancient Egyptian furniture entombed with mummies dating from First Dynasty, the tombs of Chinese emperors, and a stone pillar at the Vazhappally Maha Siva Temple in India. The dovetail design is an important method of distinguishing various periods of furniture.

The etymology of the name comes from the resemblance between the tenon or mortise of the joint to the shape of a dove's tail .

== Methods ==
The dovetail joint is very strong because of the way the 'tails' and 'pins' are shaped. This makes it difficult to pull the joint apart and virtually impossible when glue is added. This type of joint is used in box constructions such as drawers, jewellery boxes, cabinets and other pieces of furniture where strength is required. It is a difficult joint to make manually, requiring skilled workmanship. There are different types of dovetail joints.

The angle of slope varies according to the wood used, purpose of joint and type of work. Typically the slope is 1:6 for softwoods, and a shallower 1:8 slope for hardwoods. Often a slope of 1:7 is used as a compromise. However, a different slope does not affect the strength of the joint in different types of wood.

== Types of dovetails ==
=== Through dovetail ===
A through dovetail joint

A 'through dovetail' (also known as 'plain dovetail') joint leaves the end grain of both boards visible when the joint is assembled. Through dovetails are common in carcass and box construction. Traditionally, the dovetails would have often been covered by a veneer. However, dovetails have become a signature of craftsmanship and are generally considered a feature, so they are rarely concealed in contemporary work. When used in drawer construction, a through (or blind, mitred, or lapped) dovetail joint is sometimes referred to as an "English dovetail."

=== Half-blind dovetail ===
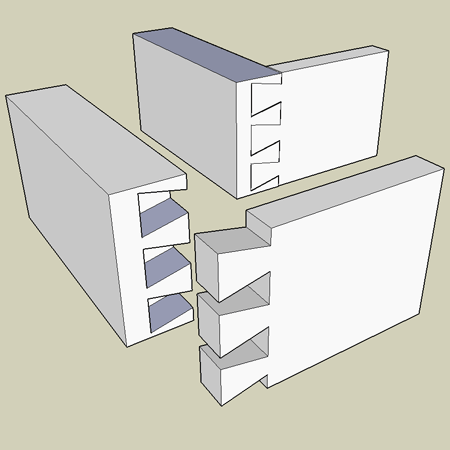
A half-blind dovetail joint

Craftsmen use a 'half-blind dovetail' when they do not want the end grain visible from the front of the joint. The tails fit into mortises in the ends of the board that is the front of the item, hiding their ends.

Half-blind dovetails are commonly used to fasten drawer fronts to drawer sides. This is an alternative to the practice of attaching false fronts to drawers constructed using through dovetails.

=== Secret mitred dovetail ===
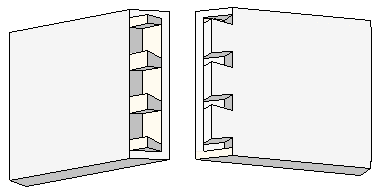
A secret mitred dovetail joint

The 'secret mitred dovetail' joint (also called a 'mitred blind dovetail', 'full-blind dovetail', or 'full-blind mitred dovetail') is used in the highest class of cabinet and box work. It offers the strength found in the dovetail joint but is totally hidden from both outside faces by forming the outer edge to meet at a 45-degree angle while hiding the dovetails internally within the joint.

The mitred corner dovetail joint is very similar in design, but it has just a single dovetail and is used for picture frames and other similar joins.

=== Secret double-lapped dovetail ===
The secret double-lapped dovetail is similar to the secret mitred dovetail, but presents a very thin section of end grain on one edge of the joint. Used for carcass and box construction to hide the dovetails completely from view.

=== Sliding dovetail ===
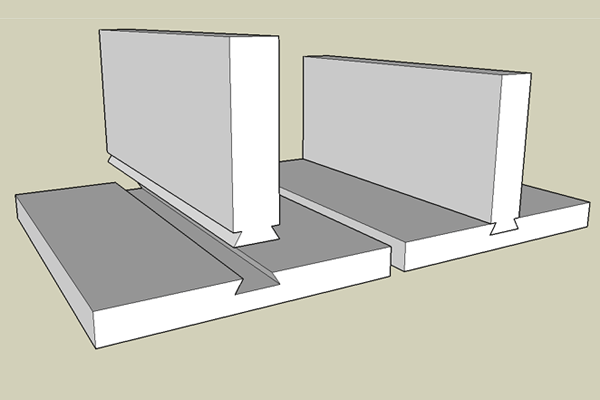
A sliding dovetail joint

The sliding dovetail is a method of joining two boards at right angles, where the intersection occurs within the field of one of the boards, that is not at the end. This joint provides the interlocking strength of a dovetail. Sliding dovetails are assembled by sliding the tail into the socket. It is common to slightly taper the socket, making it slightly tighter towards the rear of the joint, so that the two components can be slid together easily but the joint becomes tighter as the finished position is reached. Another method to implement a tapered sliding dovetail is to taper the tail instead of the socket. When used in drawer construction, a "stopped sliding dovetail" that does not extend across the full width of the board is sometimes referred to as a "French dovetail".

Used for:

- Joining shelves to cabinet sides
- Joining cabinet bottoms to sides
- Joining horizontal partitions to shelves
- Joining adjacent sections of expandable table frames
- Joining drawer fronts to sides
- Joining front rails of web frames to cabinet sides
- Joining neck and body in violins and some guitars.

== Non-woodworking dovetails ==
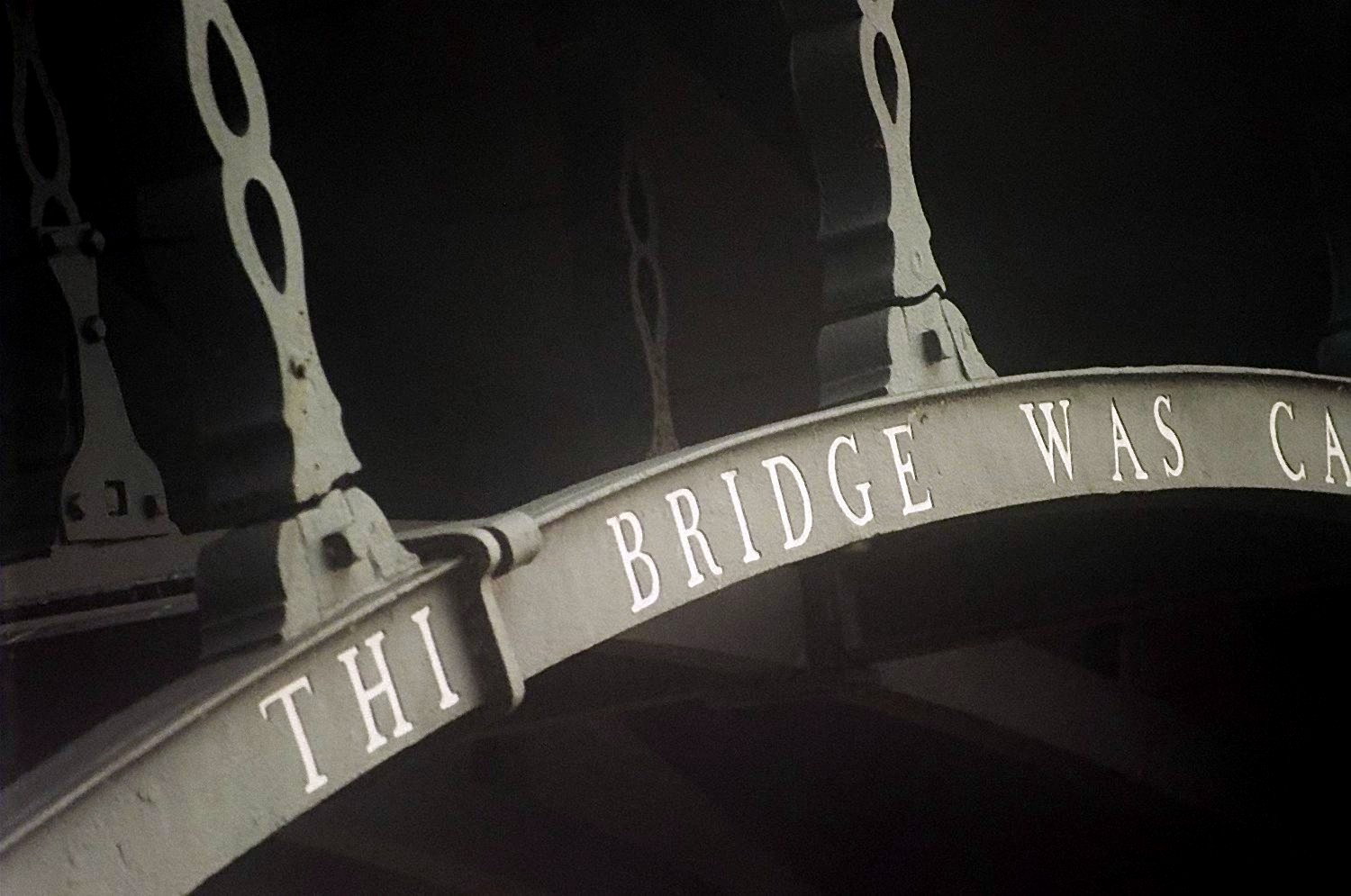
Cast iron dovetail joints in the Iron Bridge, Shropshire (Broken structure before renovation)

Dovetails are most commonly, but not exclusively, used in woodworking. Other areas of use are:

- Dovetail slides, for example on a lathe, a milling machine or other machine tools.
- Attaching turbine blades to the shaft in jet engines and other applications.
- Clockmaking: dovetailing a new tooth, when replacing broken teeth in clock gears.
- Masonry: dovetail construction is regarded a major step forward in the design of lighthouses meant for particularly dangerous areas; the Eddystone Lighthouse and Fastnet Lighthouse are examples of the durable quality of dovetail masonry.
- 3D printing: dovetail joints are commonly used to overcome the physical size limitations of a 3D printer, allowing assembled parts to exceed the printer's buildplate size.
- Aiming devices such as iron sights or telescopic sights on firearms and airguns may be affixed via a dovetail rail to the receiver or slide. 11mm or 3/8 is the most common measurement frequently used in airguns and rimfire rifles and pistols.
