= F-clamp =

Type of fastening tool

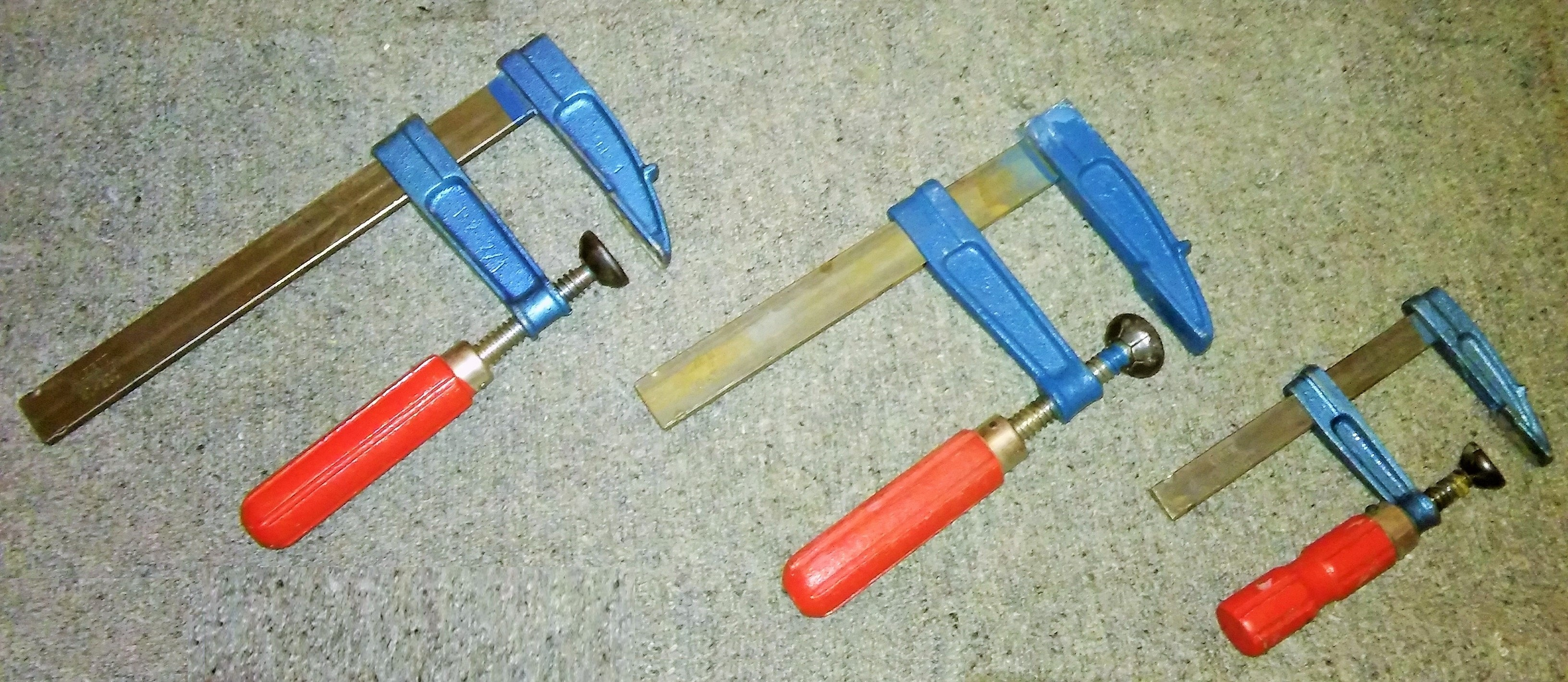
F-clamps

An F-clamp, also known as a bar clamp or speed clamp, is a type of clamp. The name comes from its "F" shape. This tool is used in woodworking while more permanent attachment is being made with screws or glue, or in metalworking to hold pieces together for welding or bolting. F-clamps are similar to but distinct from C-clamps and pipe clamps.

== Description ==
An F-clamp is a type of clamp. It is also known as a bar clamp or speed clamp. An F-clamp consists of two horizontal bars joined together by a vertical bar. This gives the clamp an appearance of the letter F. There is a large screw on the lower bar to allow for the clamp to be tightened. F-clamps are adjustable, which allows for them to be used on larger scale objects without the need for a large screw.

== Use ==
This tool is used in woodworking while more permanent attachment is being made with screws or glue, or in metalworking to hold pieces together for welding or bolting.

An F-clamp is also a simple mechanical device used for lifting engine or transmission parts. The clamp has an adjusting screw to tighten onto the part and a lifting ring to attach a hoist cable.

== Similar devices ==
The F-clamp is similar to a C-clamp in use, but has a wider opening capacity (throat). F-clamps in the industry terminology have the jaws mounted on a flat bar, while a pipe clamp, which has the same construction, is mounted on a pipe, normally of 1/2" or 3/4" diameter.

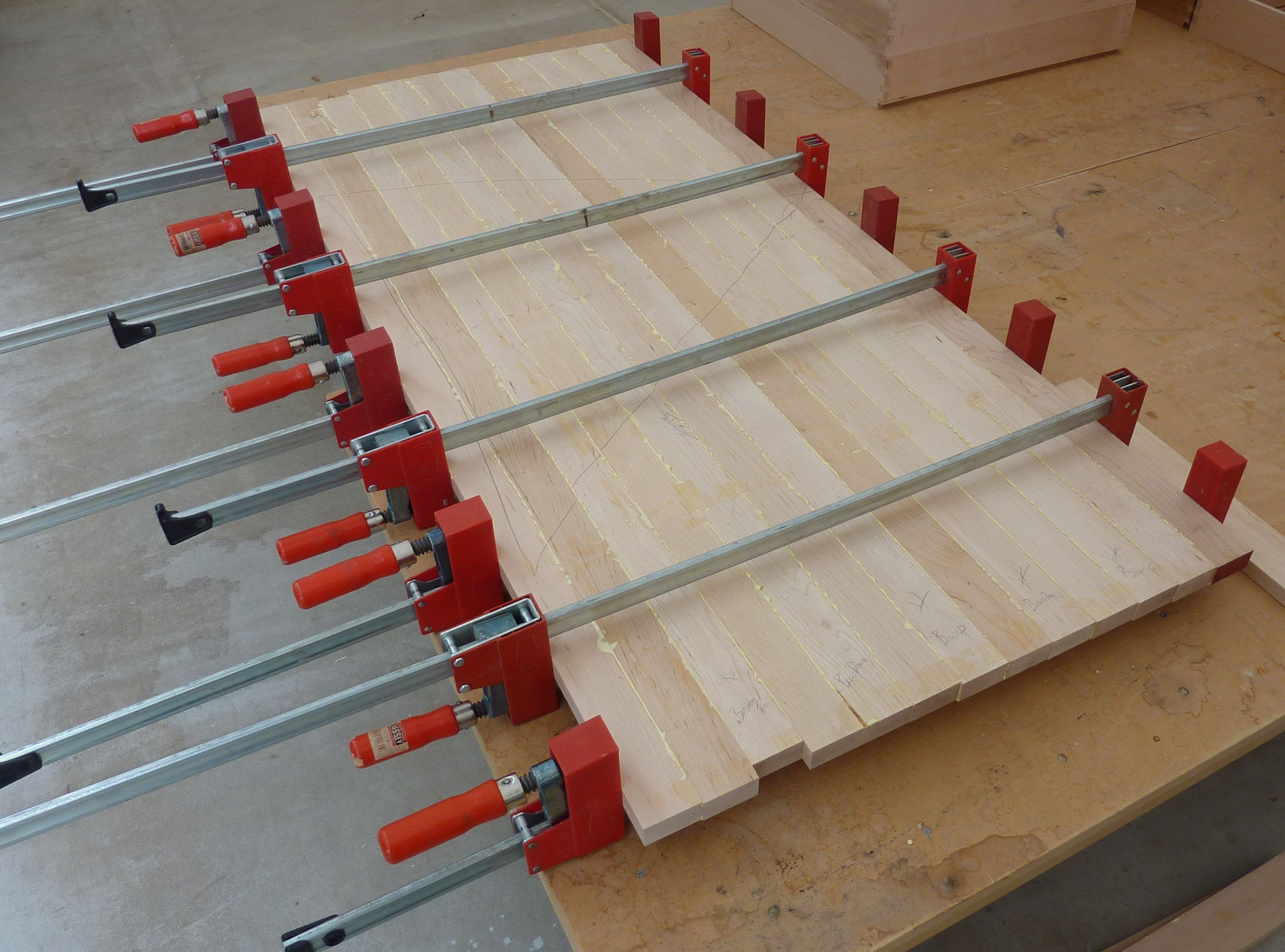
Bar clamps used to glue up a desk top

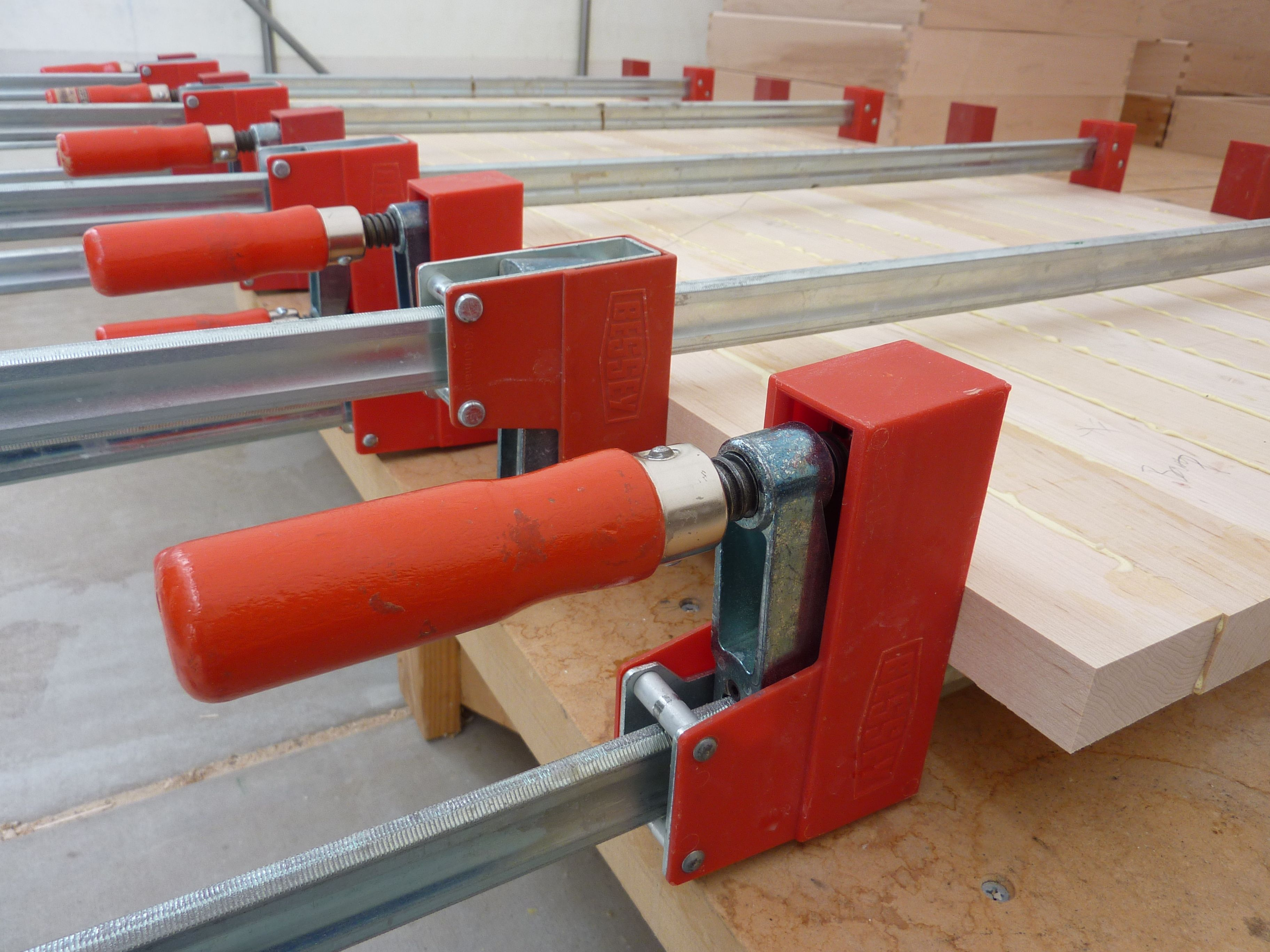
Bar clamps jaw detail

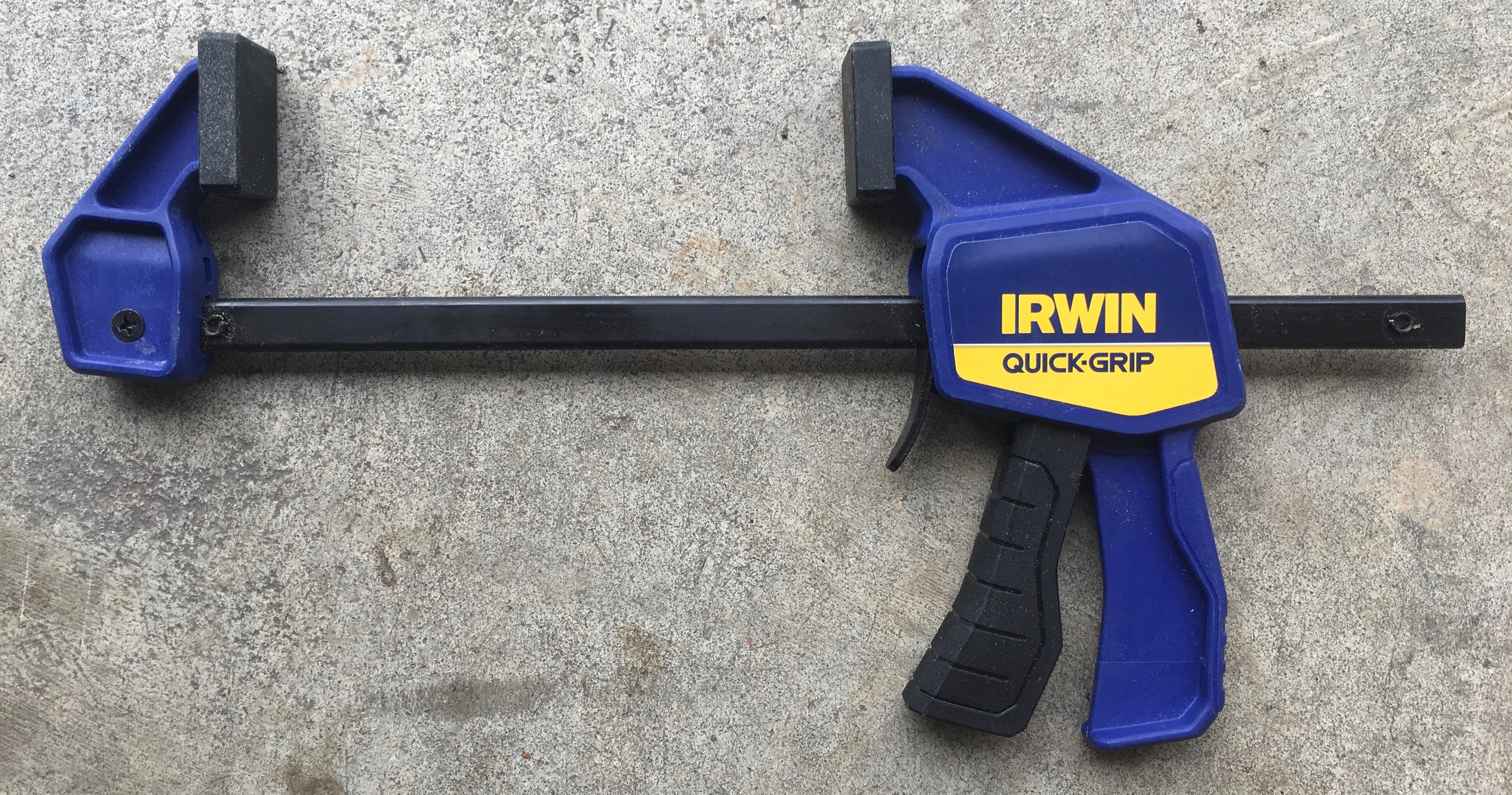
Irwin Quick-Grip sliding bar clamp
