= C-clamp =

Type of clamp device

A C-clamp or G-clamp or G-cramp is a type of clamp device typically used to hold a wood or metal workpiece, and often used in, but are not limited to, carpentry and welding. Often believed that these clamps are called "C" clamps because of their C-shaped frame, in fact, they were originally called a carriage maker's clamp, or Carriage Clamp.

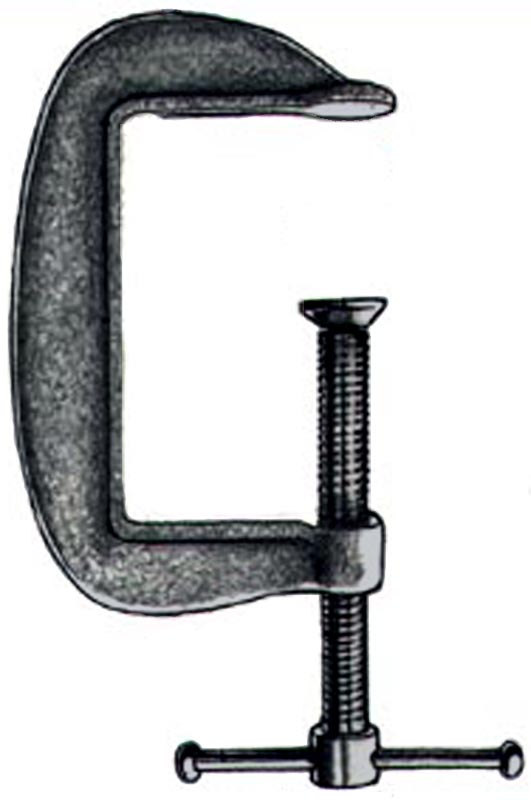
An open G-clamp

== Description ==
C-clamps are typically made of steel or cast iron, though smaller clamps may be made of pot metal. At the top of the "C" is a flat surface. At the bottom is a threaded hole through which a large screw protrudes. A flat pad is attached to the top of the screw, forming the second clamping surface, and the other end of the screw features a handle for turning the screw - usually a small metal bar, perpendicular to the screw itself. When the clamp is completely closed, the flat face of the pad is in squeezes against the flat surface of the frame. The pad swivels freely at the top of the screw, enabling the screw to be turned (tightened or loosened) without turning an object held between the pad and the top of the frame.

== Usage ==
A C-clamp is used by means of turning the screw through the bottom of the frame until the desired state of pressure or release is reached. In the case that the clamp is being tightened, this is when the objects being secured are satisfactorily secured between the pad on the screw and the flat end of the frame. If the clamp is being loosened, this is when a sufficient amount of force is released to allow the secured objects to be moved.

=== Woodworking ===
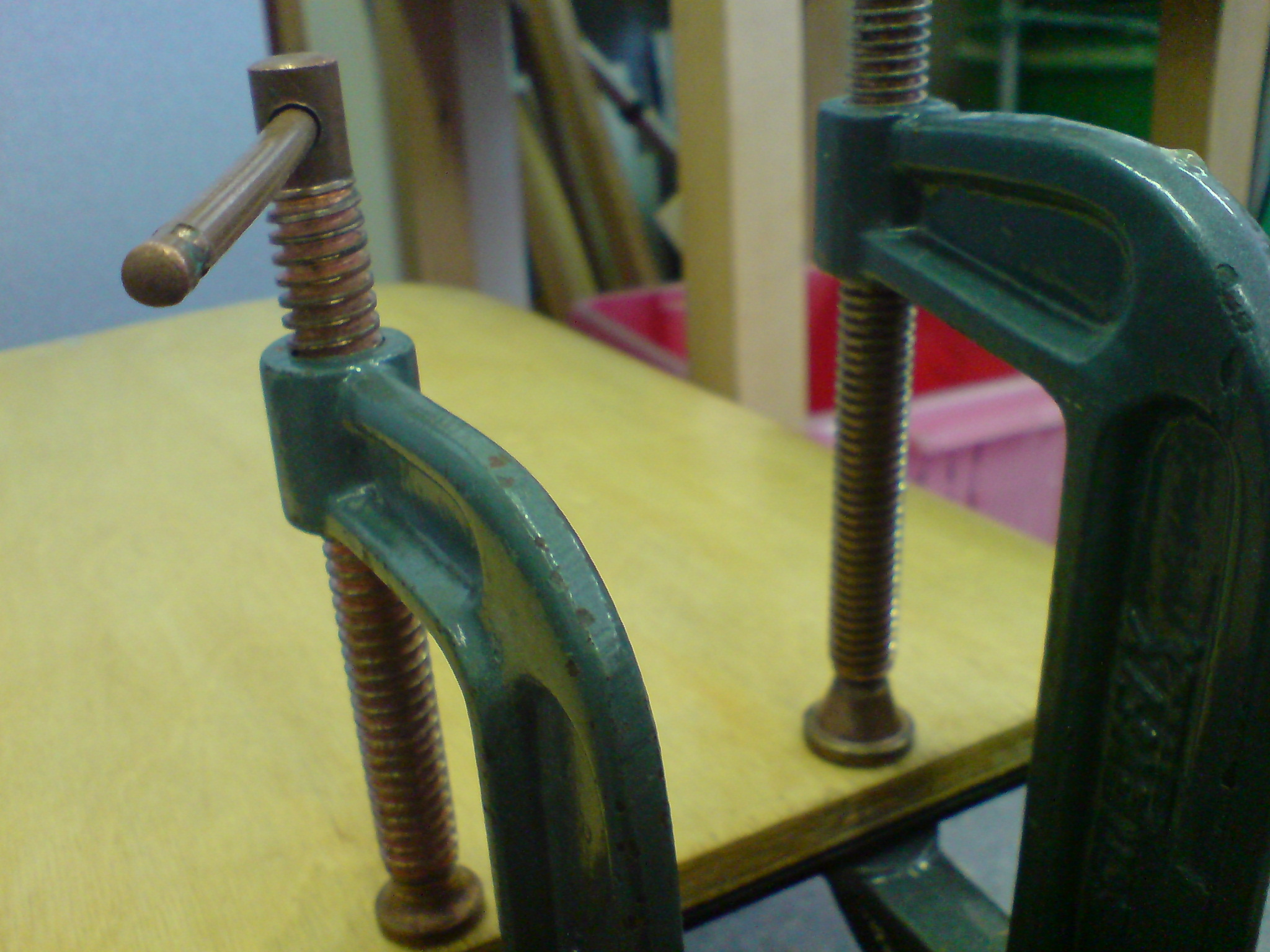
Two C-clamps in use

While a C-clamp is a useful tool for woodworking, special care should be taken when working with any woods. The flat gripping edges of the frame, generally no larger than half an inch or a centimeter (depending on the size of the clamp) can cause indentations and marring of the surfaces being clamped. This can be avoided by placing scrap wood between the clamp and the clamped object. As each piece of scrap wood is directly in contact with the flat edges of the frame and with the items being clamped, this allows the scrap wood to receive the damage from the clamping, while dispersing the clamping force across the piece of scrap wood into the clamped objects. Deep-throated clamps are also available and provide greater reach for smaller jobs.

=== Stage Lighting ===
see C-Clamp (stagecraft)

C-clamps are frequently used to hang stage lighting instruments. These clamps include a socket (designed to receive a bolt attached to the instrument's yoke) and typically feature a modified lower jaw to better grip the pipe the instrument is hung from.

== See also ==
- F-clamp
