= Flooring clamp =

Type of woodworking clamp

A flooring clamp is a clamp (or cramp) for holding tongue and groove flooring in place while laying.

== Application ==
A flooring clamp is utilized to secure tongue-and-groove flooring during the face-nailing of individual boards. Typically, between eight and ten boards can be clamped simultaneously. While a minimum of two clamps is required, it is common to use additional clamps. They should be spaced approximately every 4th or 5th joist.

== Placement ==
The clamp is placed over a joist (range 35 mm to 65 mm thick), then its ratchet action handle is used to apply horizontal pressure on a sacrificial bearing board (100 mm x 50 mm) to hold the flooring boards true and in place for fastening.

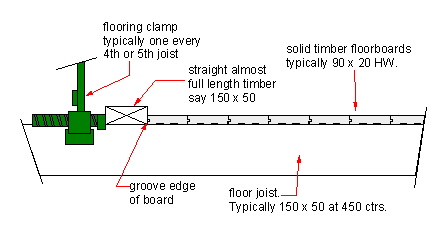
Side view of flooring clamp in use
