= Web frame =

In cabinet making, a web frame is the term for the internal structural frame of a cabinet which provides the support for drawers and also for the table/counter top. The web frame forms a divider between drawers and provides a mounting point for the drawer runners. In some cabinets, a thin sheet of plywood is inserted into a groove in the web frame to serve as a dust cover between drawers.

A basic web frame consists of a front rail which is usually visible from the front of the cabinet and two side rails which extend from the front to the rear of the cabinet. In many web frames, these side rails also serve as the drawer runners, on which the drawer itself slides. An optional rear rail may also be included.

In fine cabinet work, the front rail is connected to the sides of the cabinet, or to vertical frame members, using sliding dovetails. In solid timber carcasses, the side rails are housed in a dado in the cabinet sides and fixed only at the front to allow for seasonal movement. A screw in an elongated hole is used at the rear in such cases to hold the rail in position, whilst allowing for movement.

== See also ==
- Face frame
- Dovetail joint
