= Miter joint =

Woodworking angled joint

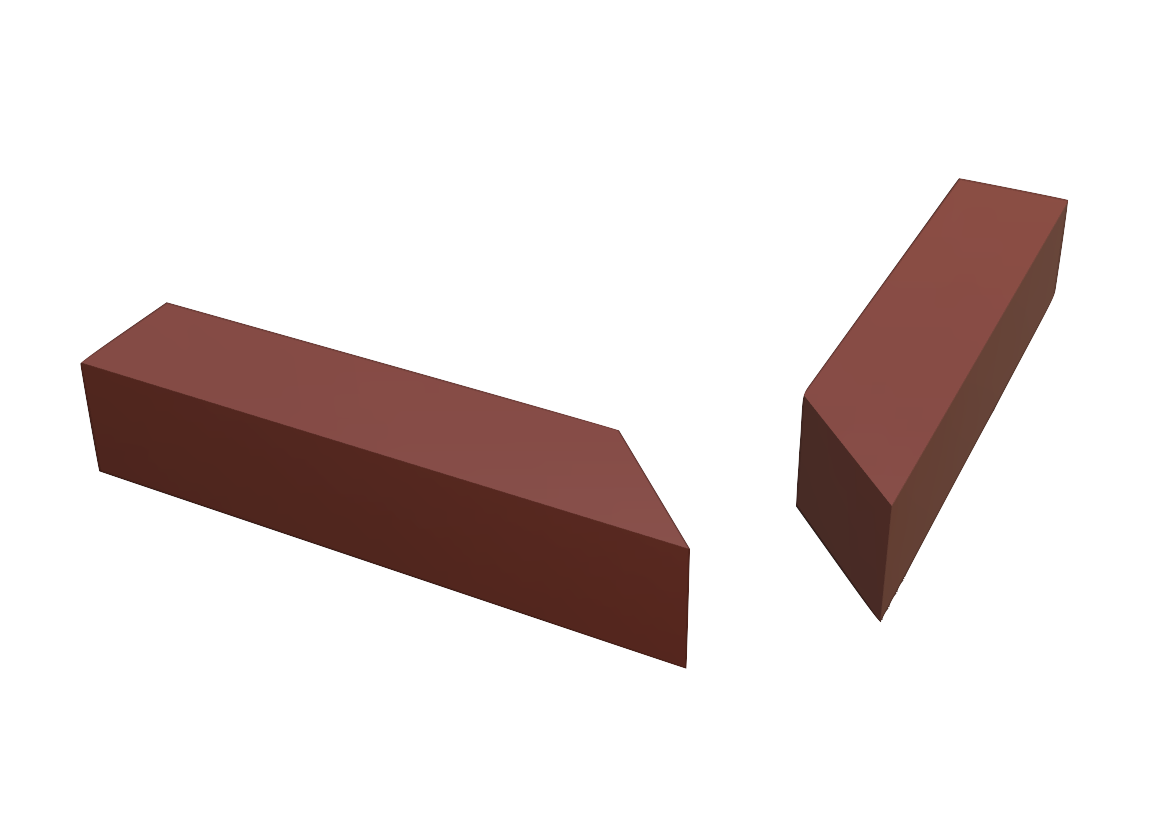
90° miter joint (pieces ready to be joined)

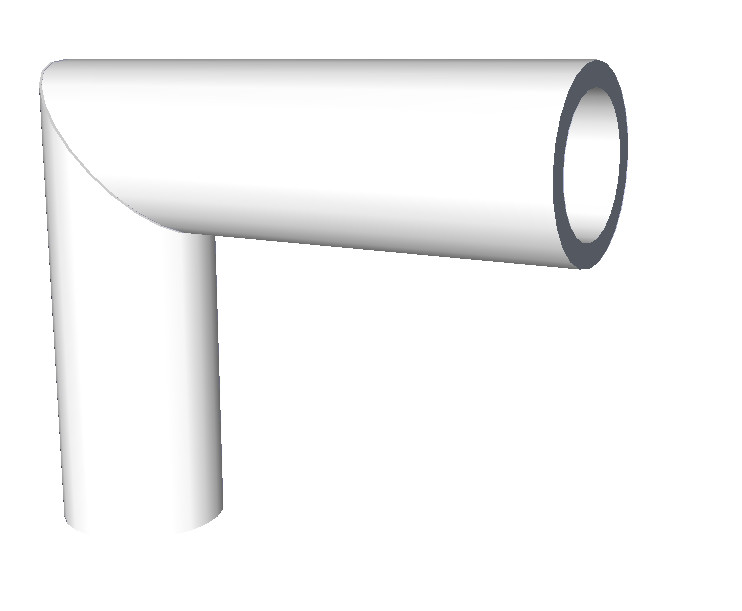
Miter joint of two pipes

A miter joint (mitre in British English) is a joint made by cutting each of two parts to be joined, across the main surface, usually at a 45° angle, to form a corner, usually to form a 90° angle, though it can comprise any angle greater than 0 degrees. It is called beveling when the angled cut is done on the side, although the resulting joint is still a miter joint.

For woodworking, a disadvantage of a miter joint is its weakness, but it can be strengthened with a spline (a thin wafer of wood inserted into a slot, usually arranged with the long grain of the spline across the short grain of the frame timber). There are two common variations of a splined miter joint, one where the spline is long and runs the length of the mating surfaces and another where the spline is perpendicular to the joined edges.

Common applications include picture frames, pipes, and molding.

== Non-perpendicular joints ==
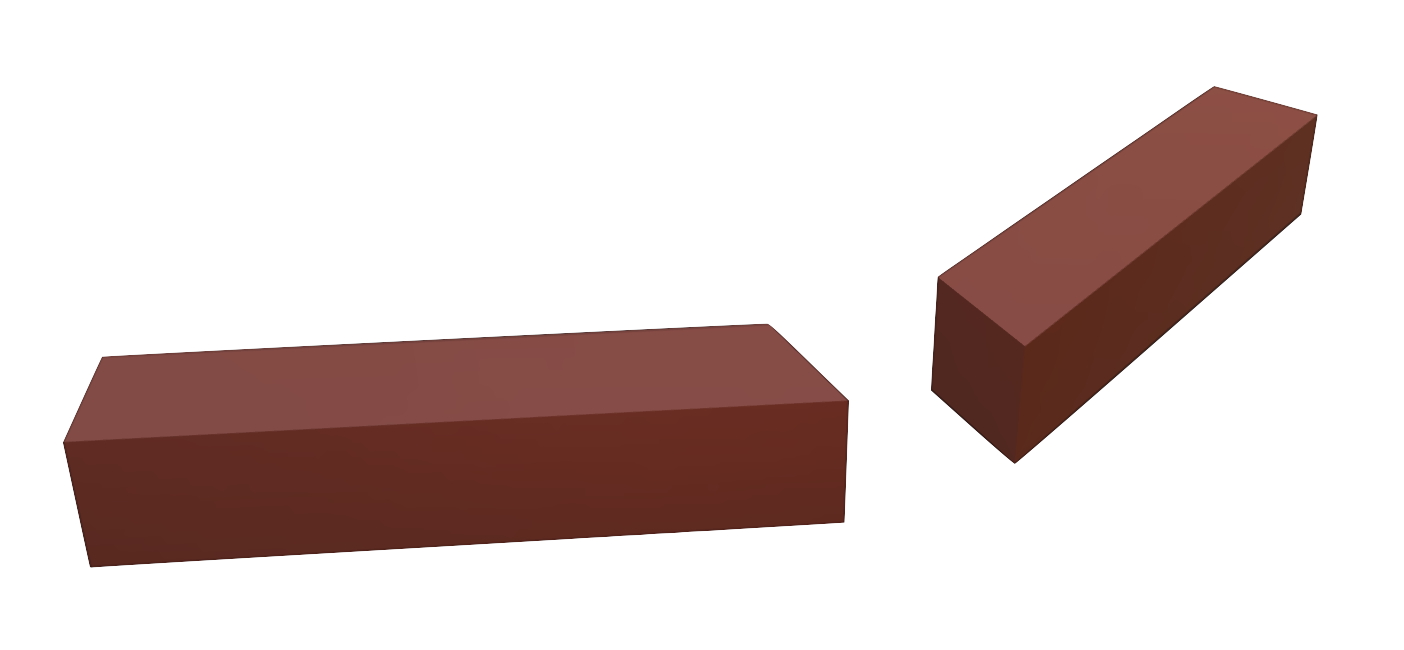
a disassembled 135° miter joint (internal angle of an octagon). Angle of the internal faces is supplement of 22.5°

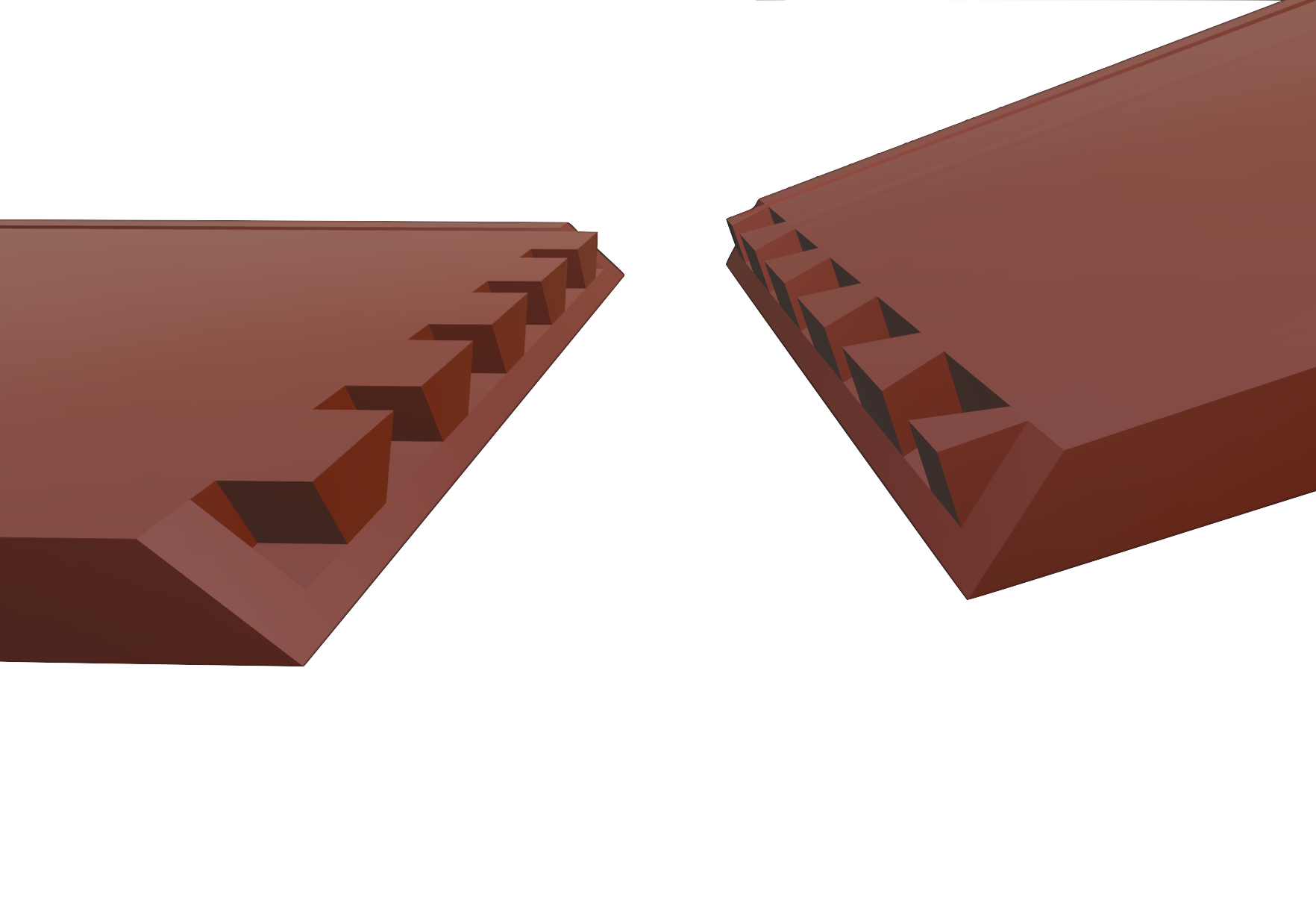
A variation of the Miter and Dovetail joint called a mitered dovetail. When assembled it appears identical to a miter yet has the same strength as a dovetail joint.

For miter joints occurring at angles other than 90°, for materials of the same cross-section the proper cut angle must be determined so that the two pieces to be joined meet flush (i.e. one piece's mitered end is not longer than the adjoining piece). To find the cut angle divide the angle at which the two pieces meet by two. Technically, two different cut angles are required; one for each piece, where the second angle is 90° plus the aforementioned cut angle, but due to angular limitations in common cutting implements (hand circular saws, table saws) a single angle is required and is used to cut the first piece in one direction and the second piece in the opposite direction.

== See also ==
- Mason's miter
- Miter box
- Miter clamp
- Miter saw
- Miter square
- Pipe notching
