= Foerster clamp =

Surgical clamp

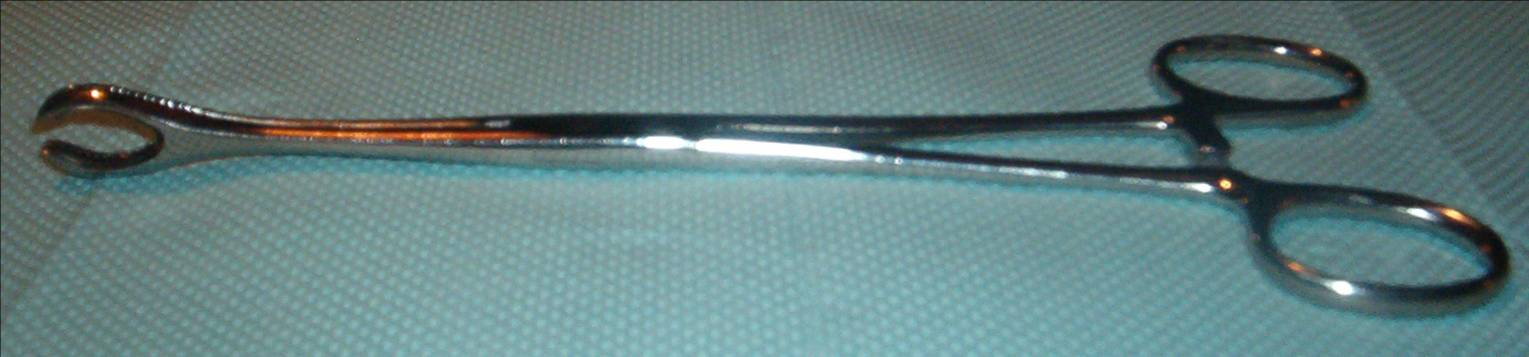
Slotted Foerster forceps

A foerster clamp is a surgical clamp with a round eyelet. Also known as a sponge clamp, or sponge stick. Used for atraumatically grasping lung tissue in thoracic surgery. When grasping a surgical sponge in the jaws, Foerster clamps are commonly used for removing small amounts of fluids from the operative area and applying pressure to sites of bleeding. May also be used for tissue dissection. Invented by David William Foerster of Oklahoma City, Oklahoma, who pioneered sex change operations in the United States.

== Non-medical uses ==
It is commonly used in body piercing, particularly for tongue piercings.

== See also ==
- Instruments used in general surgery
- Pennington clamp

== Gallery ==
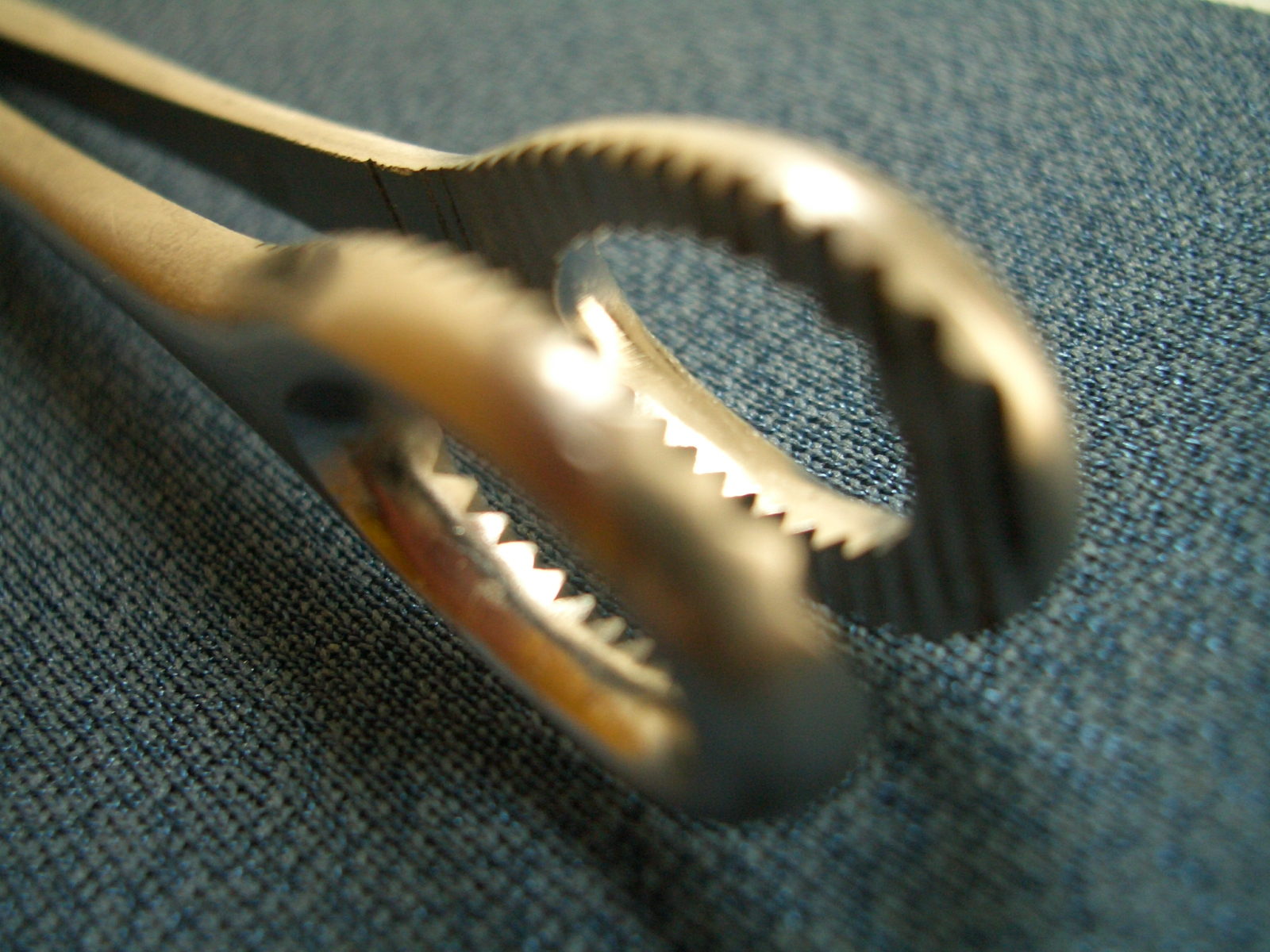

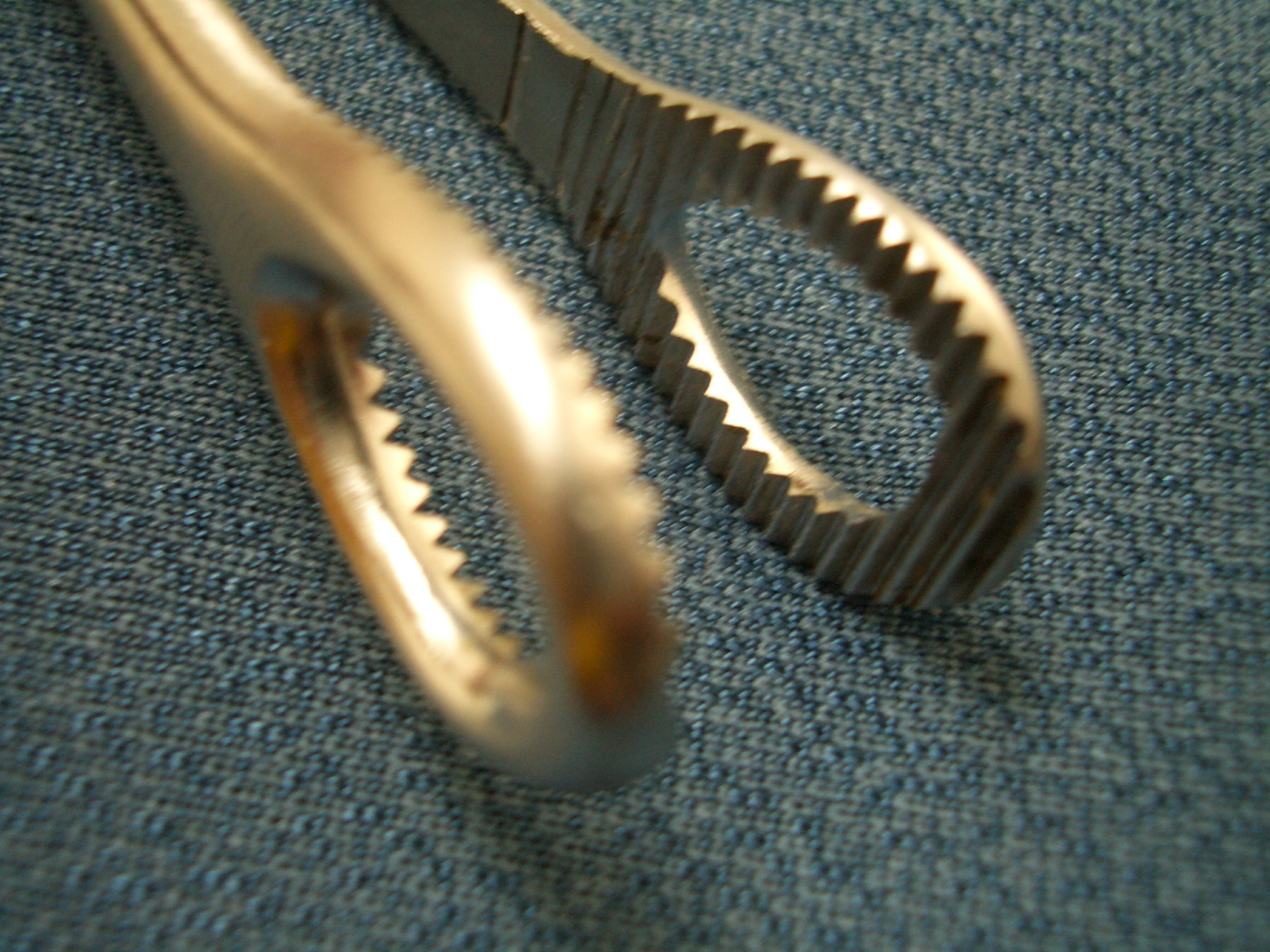

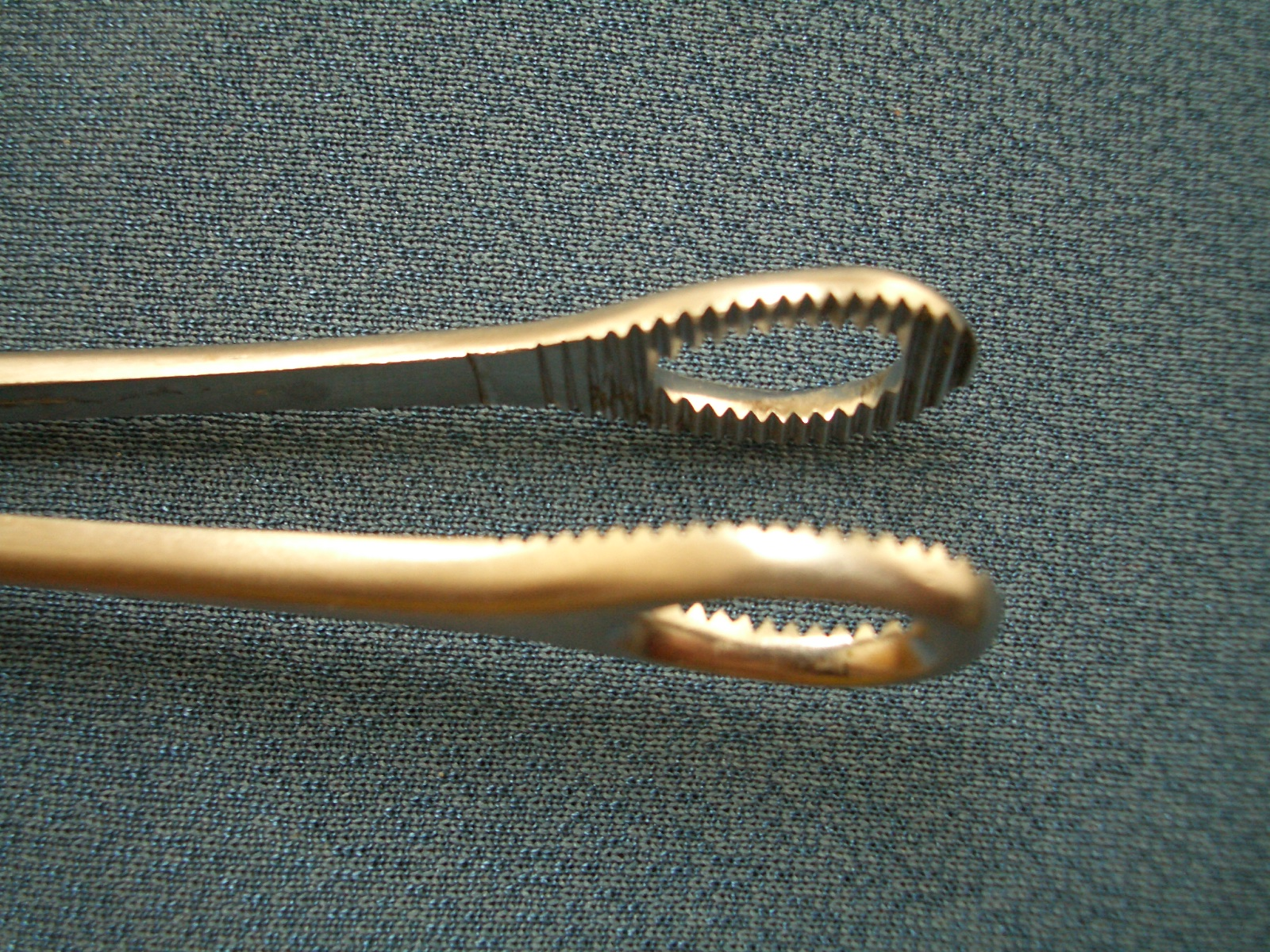

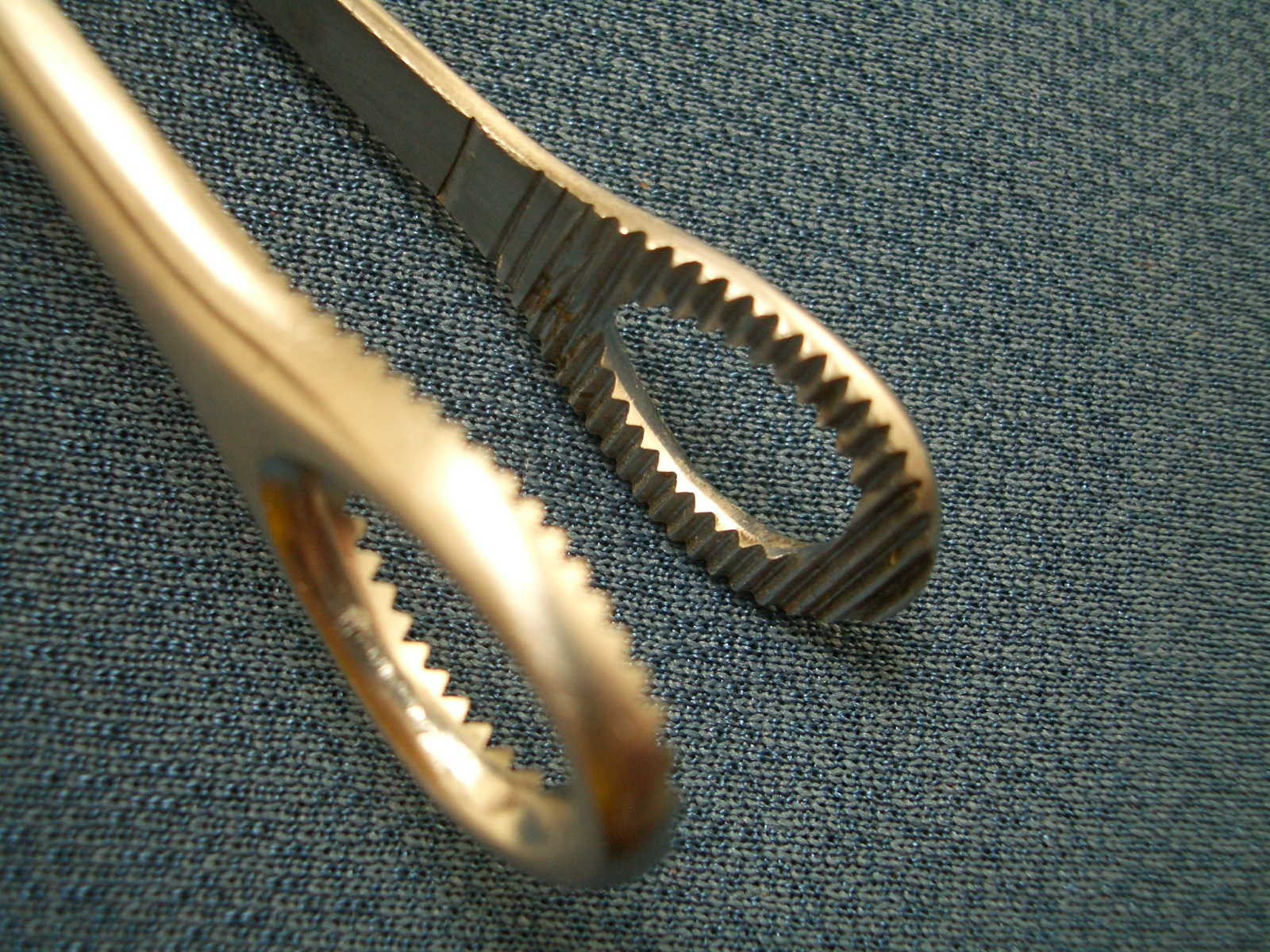

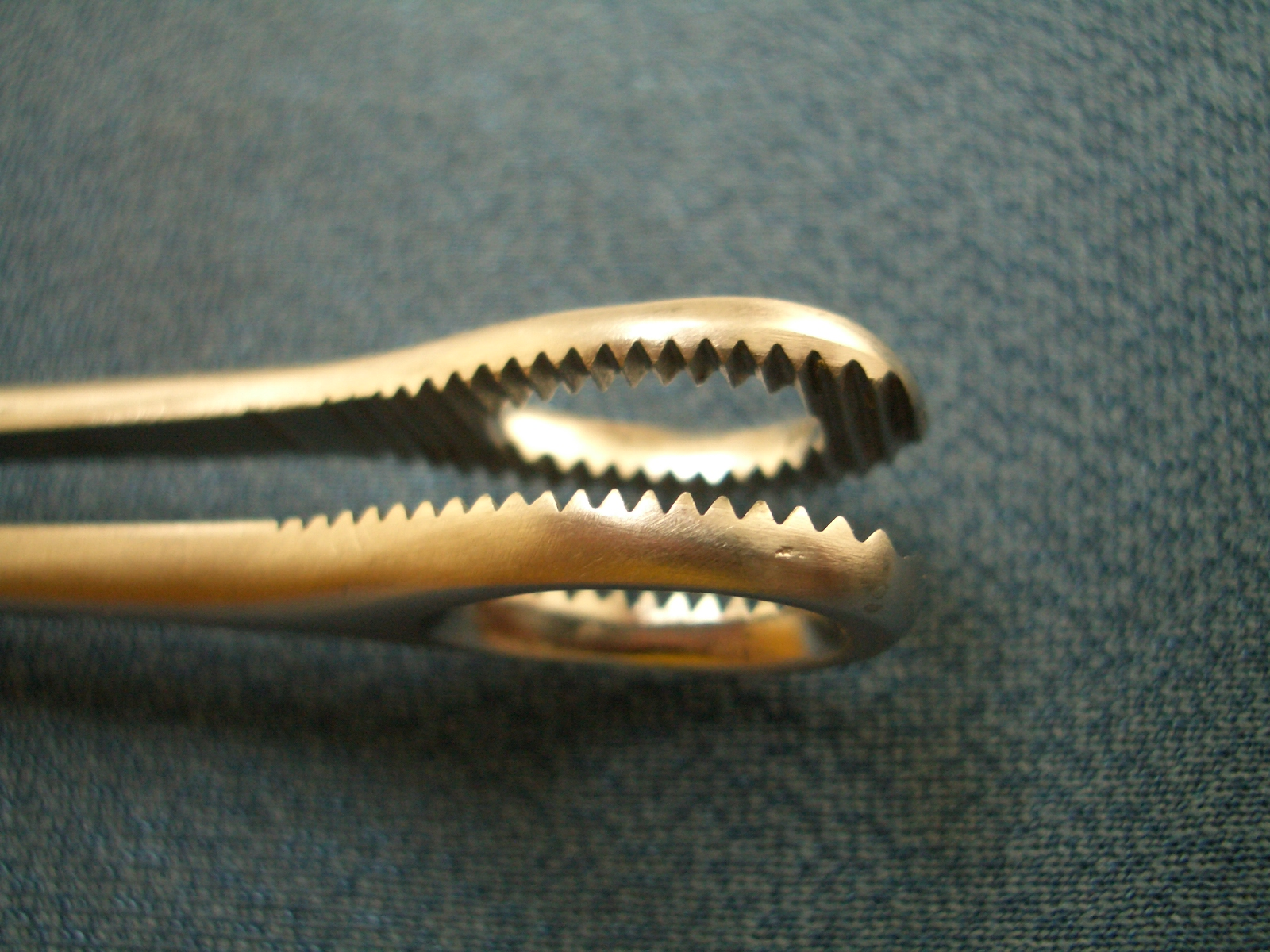
