= Mason's miter =

Masonry and woodworking technique

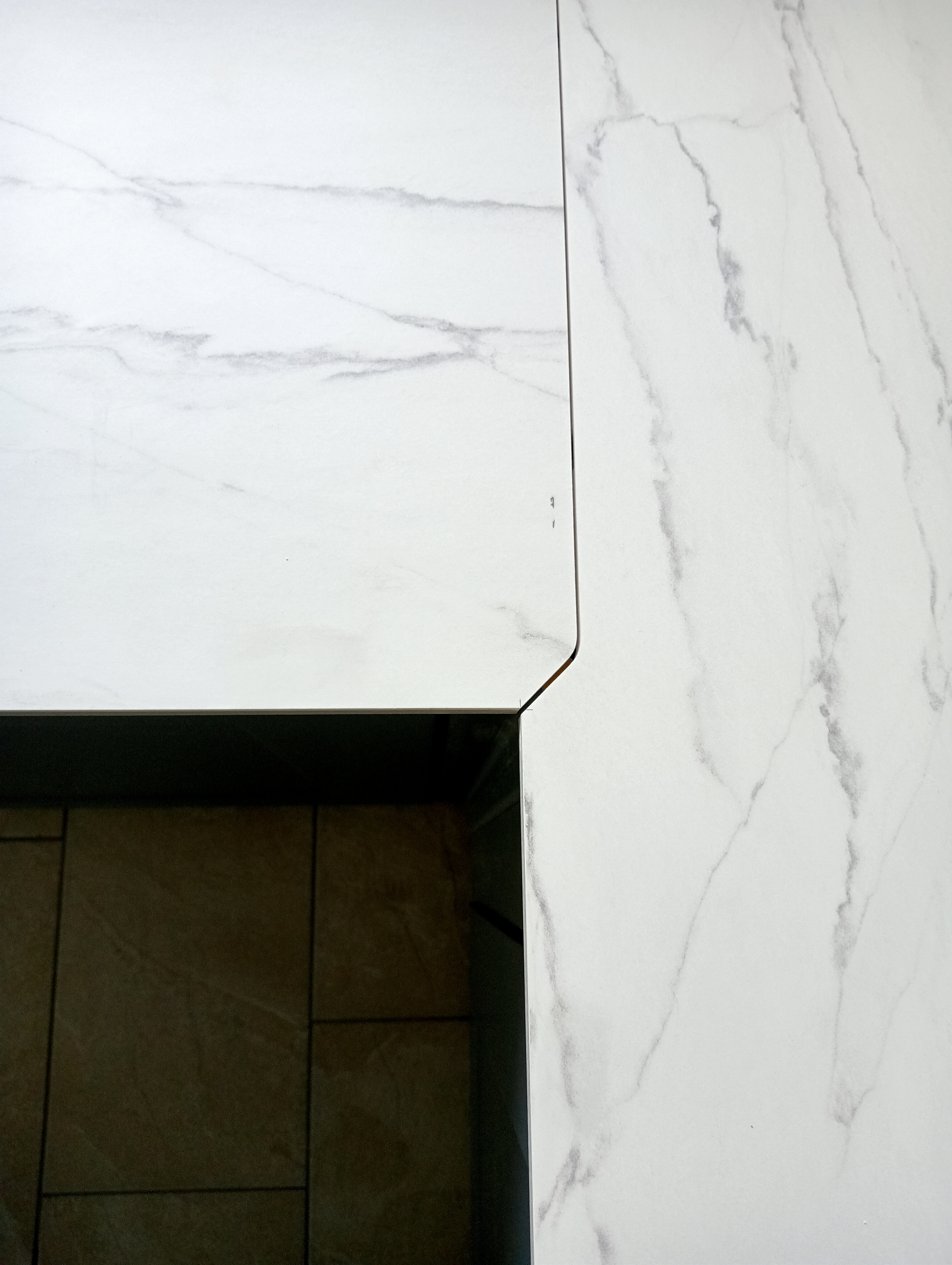
Mason's miter in a kitchen countertop

A mason's miter is a type of miter joint, traditionally used in stonework or masonry but commonly seen in kitchen countertops. In a mason's miter, the two elements being joined meet as for a butt joint but a small section of one member is removed creating a socket to receive the end of the other. A small miter is made at the inside edges of the socket and on the end of the intersecting member so that edge treatments are carried through the joint appropriately.

The mason's miter allows the appearance of a miter joint to be created with much less waste than occurs with a common miter joint, in which triangular sections must be removed from the ends of both joint members.

The terms "back miter" and "mason's miter" are often used interchangeably, but are different types of joints, and used for different purposes. Both joints are traditionally used in stone or woodwork. Neither joint requires that one part be coped (or fit) over the other. In the back miter, the joints follow the miter and stile/rail joining lines. In the mason's miter, the intersecting moldings are carved within a single stone block or the woodwork's stile, with the rail or adjacent block having a straight profile.
