= Pennington clamp =

Surgical clamp

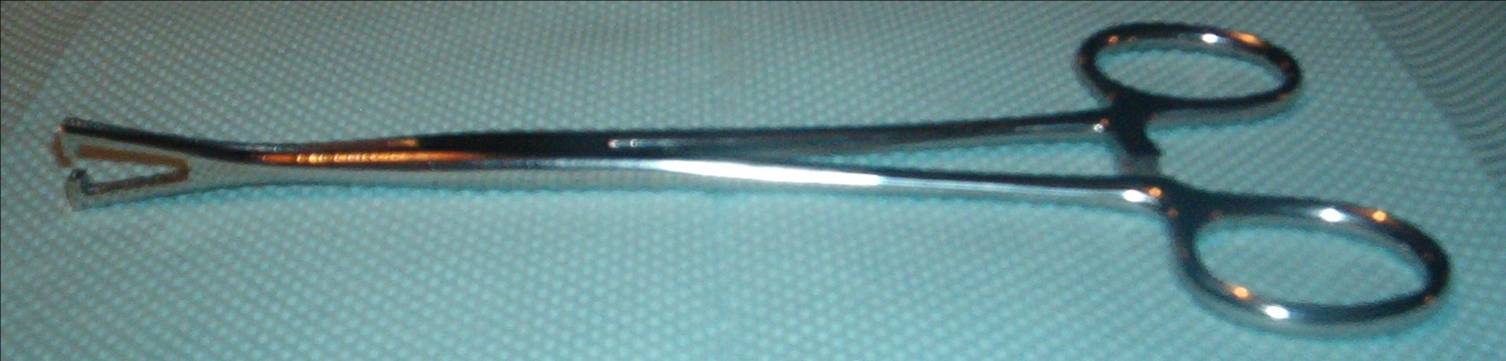
Slotted Pennington forceps

A Pennington clamp, also known as a Duval clamp, is a surgical clamp with a triangular eyelet. Used for grasping tissue, particularly during intestinal and rectal operations. Also used in some OB/GYN procedures, particularly caesarian section. Under the name 'Duval clamp' they are occasionally used much like a Foerster clamp to atraumatically grasp lung tissue. The clamp is named after David Geoffrey Pennington, an Australian surgeon who is a pioneer of microsurgeries.

== Non-medical uses ==
It is commonly used in body piercing to hold the skin in place, and guide the needle through it.

== Variants ==
In addition to the shape of the gripping head, a distinction is also made between forceps with open and closed jaws. Open forceps can be removed directly after the stitch without having to shorten the intravenous cannula or piercing needle with scissors beforehand, but offer a slightly less secure hold than closed forceps. The clamps usually have small hooks on the handle side that interlock when closed and can therefore hold the clamp closed.

=== Pennington clamp ===
A Pennington clamp, also known as a Duval clamp, has a gripping head in the shape of a triangle. The end is straight. The pliers can therefore be placed flat against the body part to be pierced and are therefore particularly suitable for piercing surface piercings, but are also frequently used for gripping free-standing body parts, for example when piercing a lobe piercing, a lip frenulum piercing or various intimate piercings.

== See also ==
- Foerster clamp
- Instruments used in general surgery
