= Gripe (tool) =

Boatbuilding tool

A gripe is a simple form of clamp used in building a clinker boat, for temporarily holding the strake which is being fitted onto the one to which it is to be attached. The strake is relatively thin and wide, so the tool must have a long reach and requires only a small movement. This is achieved by taking two pieces of dense timber, typically oak, each of a length a little more than twice the widest width of the strake. A coach bolt is fitted through the middle and adjusted so that the gripe will fit onto the land (the joint between the adjacent strakes) while admitting the point of a wedge between the free ends of the two parts of the gripe. The wedge is then tapped in so that the gripe grips the land, using the bolt as a fulcrum.

Some definitions describe the gripe as being another name for the forefoot of a boat.

The name is pronounced with the "i" as a long diphthong and is a form of the word grip.

The word "gripe" has also been used to describe a pitchfork used to handle manure.
