= Flat (theatre) =

Flat piece of theatrical scenery

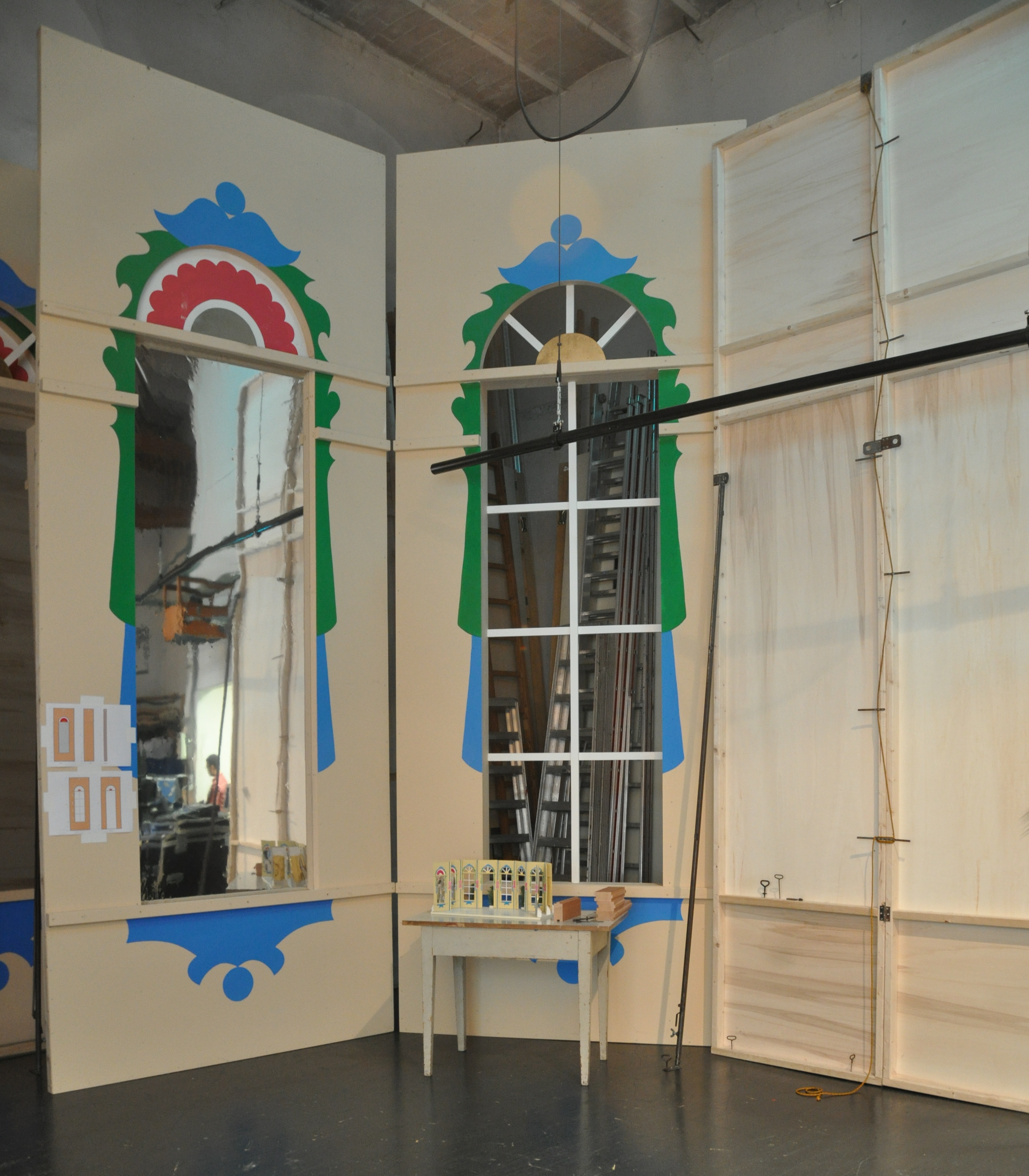
Theater flats under construction.

A flat (short for scenery flat) or coulisse is a flat piece of theatrical scenery which is painted and positioned on stage so as to give the appearance of buildings or other background.

Flats can be soft covered (covered with cloth such as muslin) or hard covered (covered with decorative plywood such as luan). Soft-covered flats have changed little from their origin in the Italian Renaissance. Flats with a frame that places the width of the lumber parallel to the face are called "Broadway" or "stage" flats. Hard-covered flats with a frame that is perpendicular to the paint surface are referred to as "Hollywood" or "studio" flats.

Usually flats are built in standard sizes of 8 feet (2.4 m), 10 feet (3.0 m), or 12 feet (3.7 m) tall so that walls or other scenery may easily be constructed, and so that flats may be stored and reused for subsequent productions.

Often affixed to battens flown in from the fly tower or loft for the scenes in which they are used, they may also be stored at the sides of the stage, called wings, and braced to the floor when in use for an entire performance.

== Flat construction ==
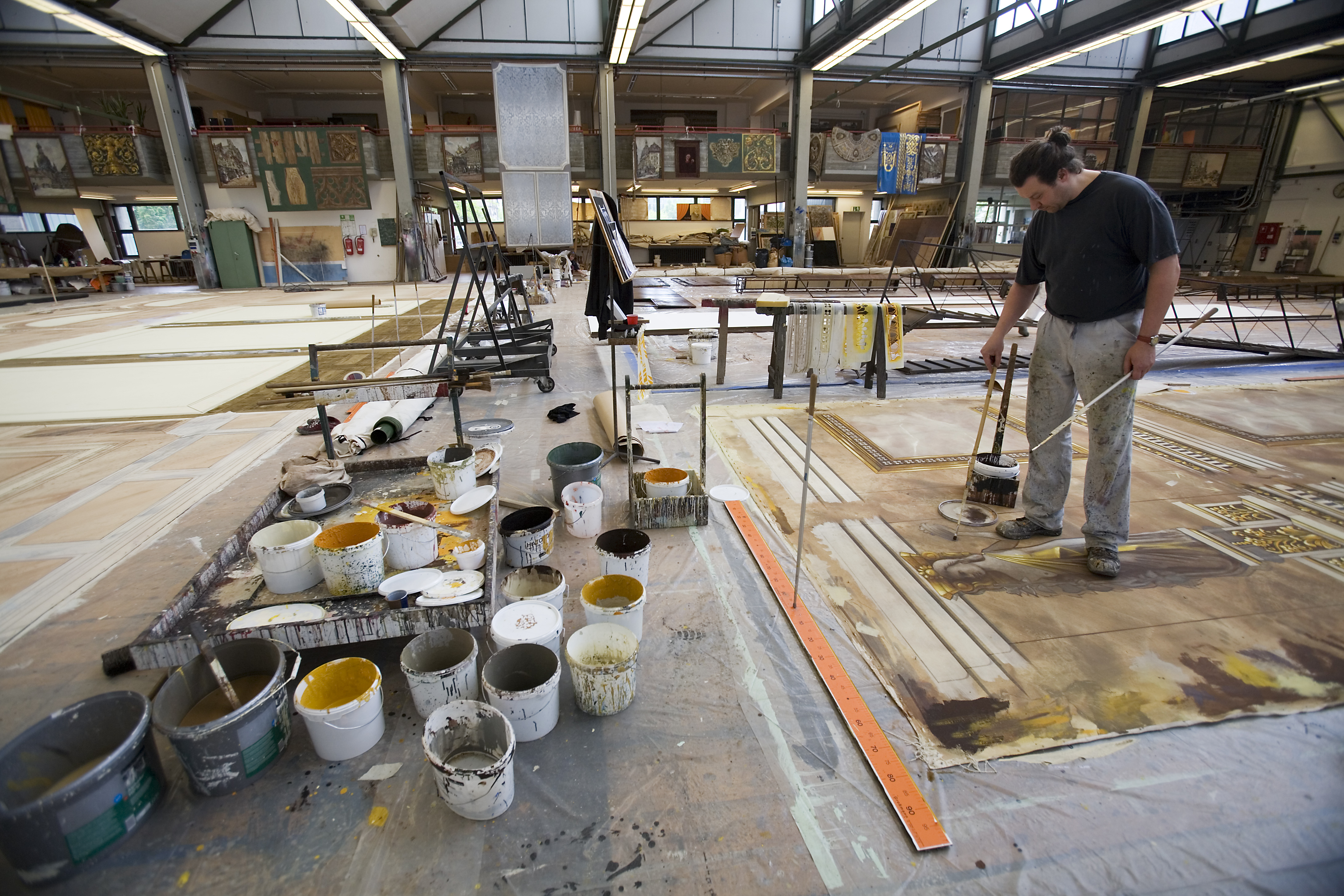
A scenic painter at work at the Semperoper in Dresden, Germany.

=== Parts of a flat ===
Rails (or plates) are the top and bottom framing members of a flat. Rails run the full width of the flat (4 feet or 1.2 metres, for a 4 by 8 feet or 1.2 by 2.4 metres, flat).

Stiles (or studs) are the vertical members of the frame. The length of the stiles is the full height of the flat, minus the combined width of the rails (7 feet 7 inches or 2.31 metres, for a 4 by 8 feet or 1.2 by 2.4 metres, flat constructed of 2 1/2-inch or 64-millimetre, rails).

Toggles are horizontal cross pieces that run between the stiles or studs. The number and placement of toggles depends on the type of flat. The length of the toggles is the total width of the flat minus the combined width of the stiles (3 feet 7 inches or 1.09 metres, for a 4 by 8 feet or 1.2 by 2.4 metres, soft-cover flat constructed of 2 1/2 inches or 64 millimetres, stiles).

Corner blocks are used to join the corners of a soft-cover flat. They are normally made of 1/4-inch (6.4 mm) plywood, and are triangles with corners of 45°, 45°, and 90°. They are most often made by ripping the plywood at 6 1/2 inches (170 mm) and then mitering it at 45 degree angles to create triangles with 9-inch (230 mm) legs.

Keystones join the toggles to the stiles of soft-cover flats. They are 8 inches (200 mm) long, and normally rip sawn to the same width as the toggles (usually 2 3/4 inches or 70 millimetres) on one end, and 3 1/2 inches (89 mm) on the other, forming a shape similar to the keystone of an archway.

Straps can be used in place of keystones. They are 8 inches (200 mm) long and 2 1/2 inches (64 mm) wide (same as toggle) rectangles. They are easier to construct than keystones, but not as strong due to their narrower dimension and reduced glue/nailing surface area.

A coffin lock or screws may be used to join securely adjacent flats, or traditionally with a lash line cleat, where cotton sash cord is lashed around cleats installed on the flat's edges. This allows for quick standing and striking of the set.

=== Styles ===
Broadway or stage flats are generally constructed of 1-by-3-inch (25 mm × 76 mm) nominal (3/4 by 2 1/2 inches or 19 by 64 millimetres actual) pine boards. The boards are laid out flat on the shop floor, squared, and joined with the keystones and corner blocks. The keystones and corner blocks are inset 1 inch (25 mm) from the outside edge, which allows for flats to be hinged or butted together. They are then glued in place, and stapled or screwed down. The flat can then be flipped over and covered with muslin or decorative plywood. Toggles in a Broadway flat are placed on 4 ft (1.2 m) centers.

Broadway flats can also be constructed using Half-lap and Cross-lap joints instead of keystones and corner blocks, and joins stiles, rails, and toggles, by sawing a 3/8 inch (9.5 mm) deep half-lap at the ends of the pieces, and/or a 3/8 inch (9.5 mm) deep dado groove mid-piece, which are then glued and stapled together. Dados can be made using a radial arm saw or table saw, and a dado stack cutter (two outer circular saw blades and one or more "chippers" between them, giving a much wider cut). Setting up for a dado stack is approximately the same as for preparing keystones and cornerblocks, but requires less layout, as the length of stiles, rails and, toggles are equal to the face of your flat.

Hollywood or studio flats can be made in various thicknesses to suit a particular design, but are most often made of 1-by-3-inch (25 mm × 76 mm) nominal (3/4 by 2 1/2 inches, 19 mm × 64 mm actual) pine boards. The boards are laid out on edge on the shop floor, the ends are glued together and stapled or screwed. Keystones and corner blocks are not normally used. Once assembled, the flat can be covered with 1/4-inch (6.4 mm) or 1/8-inch (3.2 mm) decorative plywood, which is glued on and stapled. The toggles in a Hollywood flat are placed on 2-foot (0.61 m) centers.

Hollywood flats may receive a muslin skin over the decorative plywood face. The face is covered in a mixture of water and white glue, the muslin is applied and the entire flat is covered with the water/glue mixture again, to shrink and attach the muslin.
