= Riving knife =

Safety device installed on woodworking saws

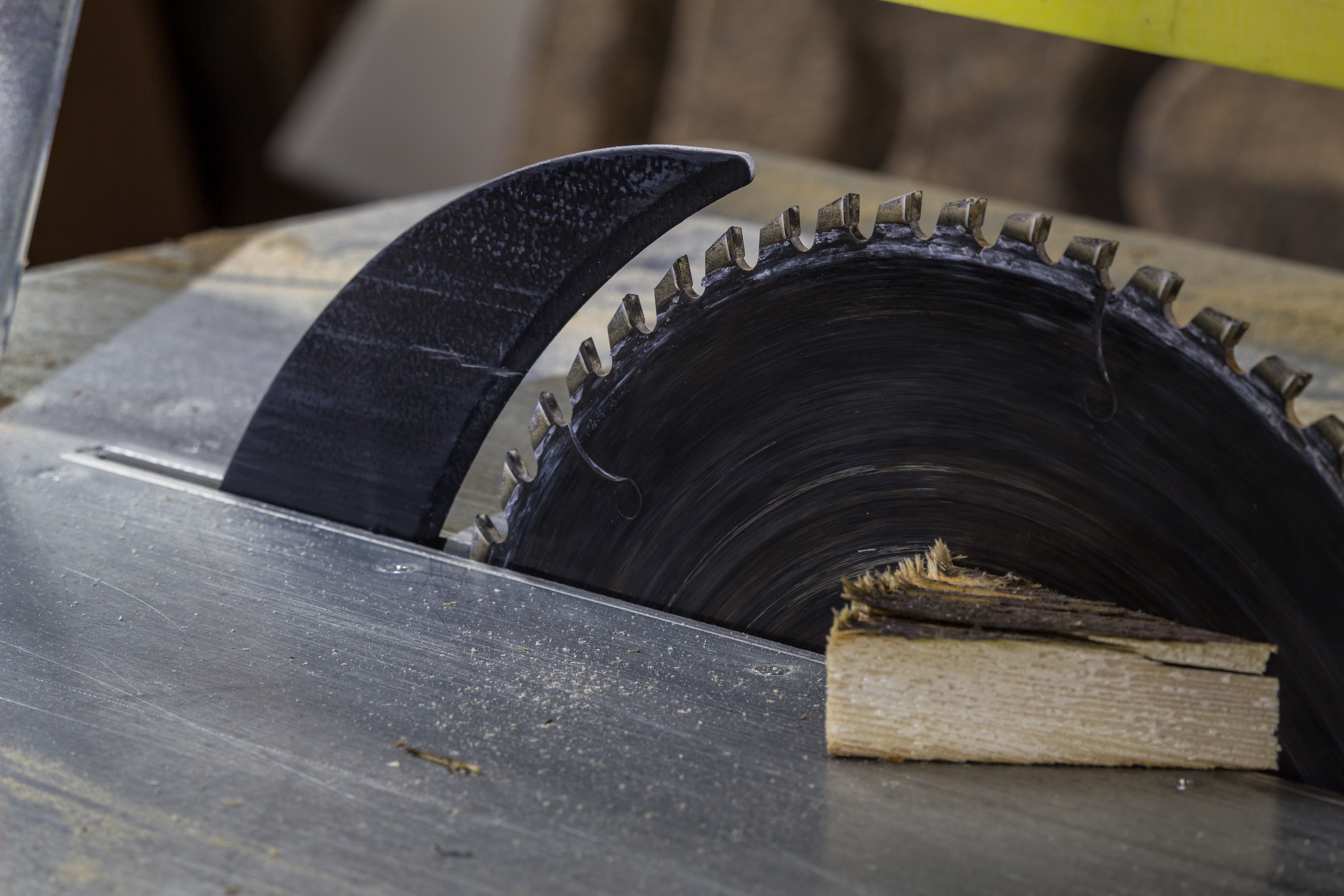
A riving knife to the left of the blade on table saw

A riving knife is a safety device installed on a table saw, circular saw, or radial arm saw used for woodworking. Attached to the saw's arbor, it is fixed relative to the blade and moves with it as blade depth is adjusted.

A splitter is a similar device attached to a trunion on the far side of the saw and fixed in relation to the saw table, which must be removed to make any non-through cuts or dados within the depth of the wood.

== Function ==
A table saw is typically used for cross-cutting and ripping; cross-cutting slices a board across its grain width-wise, ripping cuts lengthwise along the grain. Various conditions experienced while cutting either way can cause a partially cut board to move, twist, or have the saw blade's kerf close up and bind the blade. Poor blade or fence alignment, operator error, or pre-existing stresses in the wood released by cutting may cause these different and dangerous conditions. A riving knife rides within the kerf, pivoting on the saw's arbor in relation to blade height, to maintain an even gap between the two cut sides of the board, preventing jamming which could cause the stock to be forcefully ejected rearward toward the saw's operator.

Kickback can pull the operator's hand into contact with the saw blade, as demonstrated by Popular Mechanics.

=== Forms of kickback ===
Saw blade "grabbing" occurs more frequently during ripping than cross-cutting. It can occur with both hand saws and bandsaws but is more dangerous with a circular saw as areas of the circular blade close to the cutting area are moving in different directions. If a bandsaw grabs, the wood is pressed safely down into the machine table (though the saw may jam, stall or break the blade). If a table saw grabs at the rear of the blade where the teeth are rising up from the table, it may rapidly lift the wood upwards. The wood is then likely to catch the teeth on top of the blade and be thrown forwards at high speed towards the operator. This accident is termed a "kickback".

Table saw kickback may occur if the saw's fence is not parallel with the blade, but is slightly closer to the rear of it than the front, causing the fence to push the wood into the rear of the blade. This is especially likely when cross-cutting sheet materials that are wider than the cut length, which may pivot on the table and jam against the blade. If a proper cross-cutting jig is not being used, the fence should be adjusted (either slid forward, or a false fence added) so the end of the fence stops alongside the blade, leaving a free space for the cut-off to pivot into without binding.

Kickback may also occur when a loose piece of wood, freshly cut free, slips against the back of the blade. Apart from the measures above, this "falling board" may require an assistant to control it.

== Riving knife versus splitter ==
A splitter is a stationary blade of similar thickness to the rotating saw blade mounted behind it to prevent a board from pinching inward into the saw kerf and binding on the saw blade, potentially causing a dangerous kickback. Like a riving knife, its thickness should be greater than the body of the saw blade but thinner than its kerf. Blades with a narrow kerf relative to their body are more susceptible to grabbing and kickback.

A riving knife has these advantages over a splitter:

- It does not need to be removed from the saw when cross-cutting or doing a blind (non-through) cut as it does not extend above the top of the saw blade. If it is not removed, the operator cannot forget to put it back on.
- It sits closer to the back edge of the blade, making it much more effective – less space for the stock to shift into the path of the blade
- It provides some additional protection for the operator – blocking contact to the back edge of the blade – in those situations where the stock is being pulled from the outfeed side of the saw.
- It is independent of (and will not interfere with) other blade guards and dust collectors

It achieves all of this by being attached to the saw's arbor, allowing it to move with the saw blade as the blade is raised, lowered and tilted.

Riving knives are also fitted to some hand-held electrical circular and powered miter or cross-cut saws (known generically as "chop saws").

Since 2008, Underwriters Laboratories (UL) requires that all new table saw designs include a riving knife.

== Other anti-kickback devices ==
=== Featherboard ===
A featherboard is a safety device that applies sideways pressure holding the workpiece against the saw fence. It can reduce the risk of a kickback developing, but will not restrain the board if one does occur.

=== Kickback pawl ===
Some US table saws are fitted with sharpened ratchet teeth on a free-swinging pawl attached to the guard which restrain a board during a kickback. This combination may require awkward adjustment and is ineffective compared to the splitter.

== See also ==
- Stop block
