= Tongue and groove =

Method of fitting similar objects together

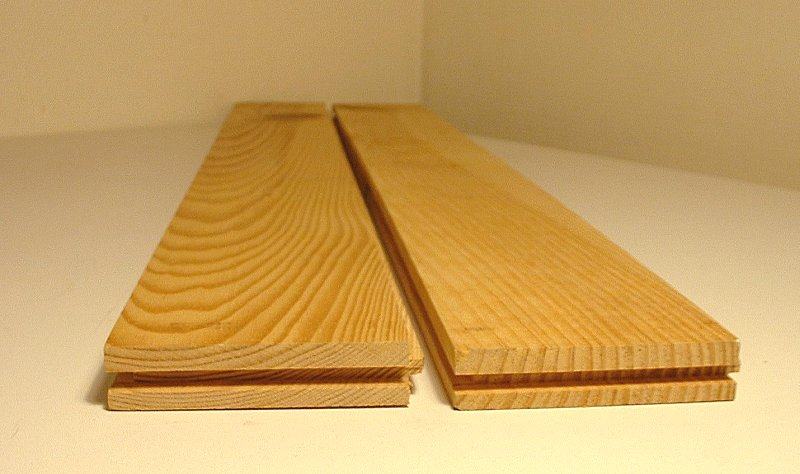
Solid parquet boards with grooves on the near ends. Tongues on the right sides of the boards and grooves on the left sides. The far ends are tongued.

Tongue and groove is a method of fitting similar objects together, edge to edge, used mainly with wood, in flooring, parquetry, panelling, and similar constructions. A strong joint, it allows two flat pieces to be joined strongly together to make a single flat surface. Before plywood became common, tongue-and-groove boards were also used for sheathing buildings and to construct concrete formwork.

Each piece has a slot (the groove or dado) cut all along one edge or along two adjacent edges, and a thin, deep ridge (the tongue) on the opposite edge or edges. The tongue projects a little less than the depth of the groove. Two or more pieces thus fit together closely. The joint is not normally glued, as shrinkage would then pull the tongue off. The effect of wood shrinkage is concealed when the joint is beaded or otherwise moulded. In another assembly method, the pieces are end-matched. This method eliminates the need for mitre joints, face nailing, and the use of joints on 16-inch (410 mm) or 24-inch (610 mm) centres of conventional framing. For joining thicker materials, several tongue-and-groove joints may be used one above the other. In fine woodworking such as cabinet making, both glued dovetail joints and tongue-and-groove joints are used.

For many uses, tongue-and-groove boards have been rendered obsolete by the introduction of plywood and later composite wood boards, but the method is still used in higher-quality boards. Plywood may also be tongued all round to fit flush into a framed structure, and plywood for sub-floors used in platform framing is often supplied with tongue-and-groove edges.

In old sailor slang vernacular, a tonguin (pronounced /təŋɪn/) refers to a small boat or raft of tongue-and-groove construction or to repairs made to such a craft.

== Methods ==
One of the following woodworking tools may be used to produce the tongue and groove:

- A wood shaper (spindle moulder) – a four- or six-head moulder for large quantities
- A circular saw bench
- Suitable hand planes: a plough plane for the groove and a tongue plane for the tongue, or a combination plane
- A spindle router

== Tongue in groove (Slip tongue and groove) ==
Tongue in groove is similar to tongue and groove, but instead of the tongue forming part of one of the edges, it is a separate, loose piece, called a slip tongue or spline, that fits between two identically grooved edges. The tongue may or may not be of the same material as the grooved pieces joined by the tongue. For example, plywood flooring is commonly grooved at the edges, and plastic tongues are used to form the joint.

== See also ==
- Cabinet making
- Carpentry
- Fluting (architecture)
- Gland (engineering)
- Groove (engineering)
- Larssen sheet piling
- Pulley
- Rabbet
- Woodworking joints
