= Pinko Izumi =

Japanese actress and singer

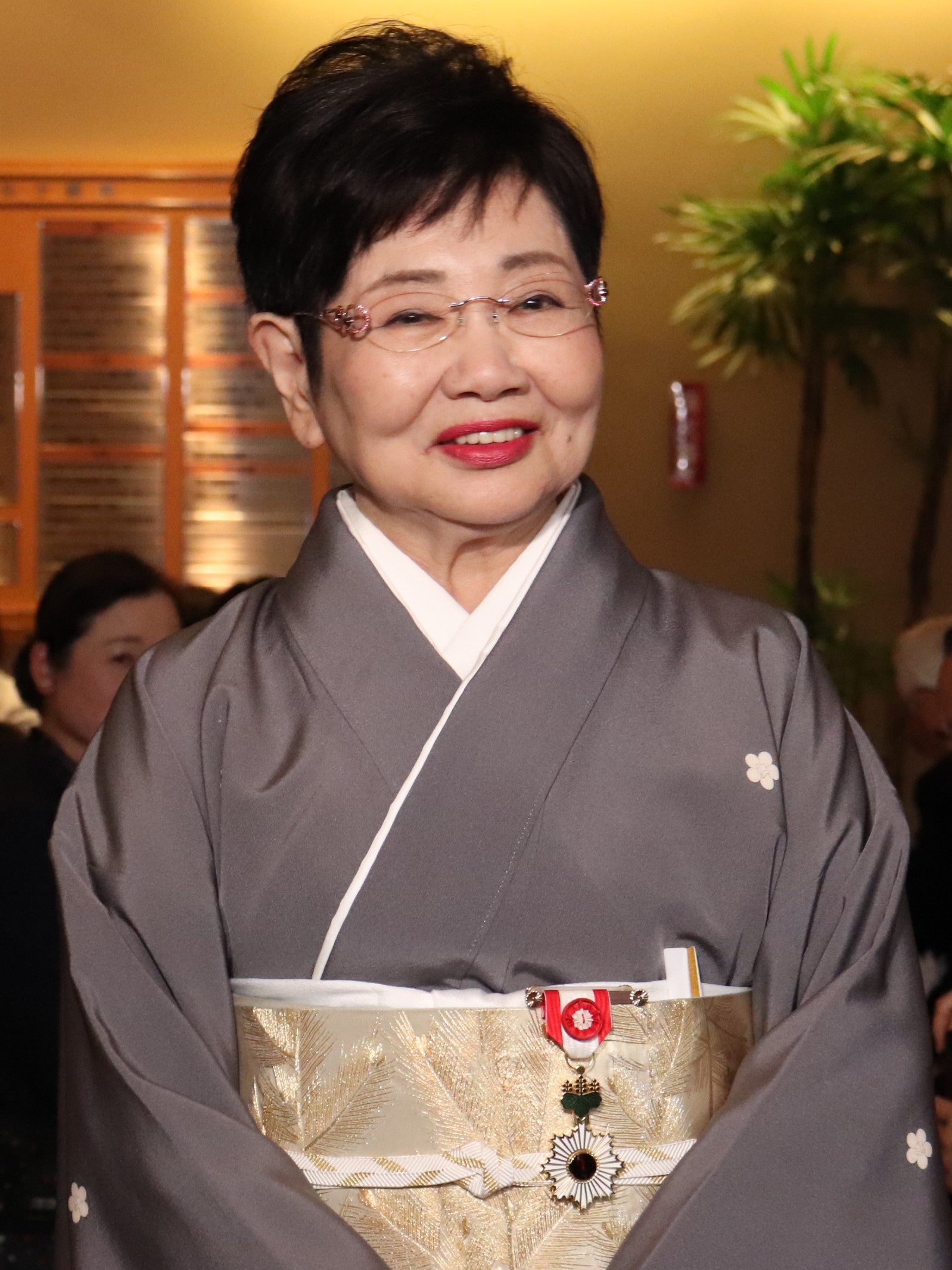

Pinko Izumi (泉ピン子, Izumi Pinko; born September 11, 1947 in Tokyo, Japan) is a Japanese actress and singer. Her legal name is Sayo Takemoto (武本 小夜, Takemoto Sayo; née Eguchi (江口)), and she originally performed under the name Mariko Mikado (三門 マリ子, Mikado Mariko).

== Filmography ==
=== Television ===
- Onna Taikoki (NHK, 1981) as Asahi no kata
- Oshin as Fuji (NHK, 1983)
- Sanga Moyu (NHK, 1984)
- Inochi (NHK, 1986)
- Wataru Seken wa Oni Bakari as Kojima Satsuki (TBS, 1990–present)
- Onna wa Dokyo (NHK, 1992)
- Hito no Fuko wa Mitsu no Aji (TBS, 1994)
- Kamisan no Waruguchi (TBS, 1995)
- Papa Survival (TBS, 1995)
- Tatakau Oyome-sama (NTV, 1995)
- Dareka ga Dareka ni Koishiteru (TBS, 1996)
- Bancha mo Debana (TBS, 1997)
- Subarashiki Kazoku Ryokou (TBS, 1998)
- Haru no Wakusei (TBS, 1999)
- Romance (NTV, 1999)
- Onna to Ai to Mystery (TV Tokyo, 2001–present)
- Akarui Hou e Akarui Hou e as Takahashi Utako (TBS, 2001)
- Blackjack ni Yoroshiku as Kaneko Akiko (TBS, 2003, episodes 1–2)
- Hatsu Tsubomi (TBS, 2003)
- Chotto Matte Kami-sama (NHK, 2004)
- Akai Tsuki as Hara Yoko (TV Tokyo, 2004)
- Misora Hibari Tanjo Monogatari as Kato Kimie (TBS, 2005)
- Haru to Natsu as Nakahara Misa (NHK, 2005)
- Yato (TBS, 2005)
- Onna no Ichidaiki: Setouchi Jakucho as Omata Kin (Fuji TV, 2005)
- Satomi Hakkenden as Kamezasa (Fuji TV, 2006)
- Waraeru Koi wa Shitakunai as Ooyama Kazuyo (TBS, 2006)
- Shinjuku no Haha Monogatari as Kurihara Sumiko (Fuji TV, 2006)
- Saga no Gabai-baachan (Fuji TV, 2007)
- Ai no Rukeichi (NTV, 2007)
- Kazoku e no Love Letter (Fuji TV, 2007)
- Joshi Deka! as Sakura Hanako (TBS, 2007)
- Asakusa Fukumaru Ryokan as Himeda Natsuko (TBS, 2007, episode 10)
- Egao wo Kureta Kimi e (Fuji TV, 2008)
- Kurobe no Taiyo as Kuramatsu Tsuru (Fuji TV, 2009)
- Tonari no Shibafu as Takahira Shino (TBS, 2009)
- Chichi yo, Anata wa Erakatta (TBS, 2009)
- Doctor-X: Surgeon Michiko Daimon Season 4 (TV Asahi, 2016) as Dr. Toko Kubo
- Segodon (NHK, 2018) as Honju-in

=== Films ===
- Oshin (2013)
- Old Car (2023)
- Zagin de Shisu!? (2024)

== Honours ==
- Order of the Rising Sun, 4th Class, Gold Rays with Rosette (2019)
