= SawStop =

American table saw manufacturer

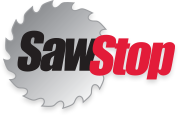
- Industry: Manufacturing
- Founded: 2000; 26 years ago
- Headquarters: Tualatin, Oregon, US
- Key people: Steve Gass, David Fanning, and David Fulmer (cofounders)
- Products: Table saws
- Owner: TTS Tooltechnic Systems Holding AG (Germany)
- Website: www.sawstop.com

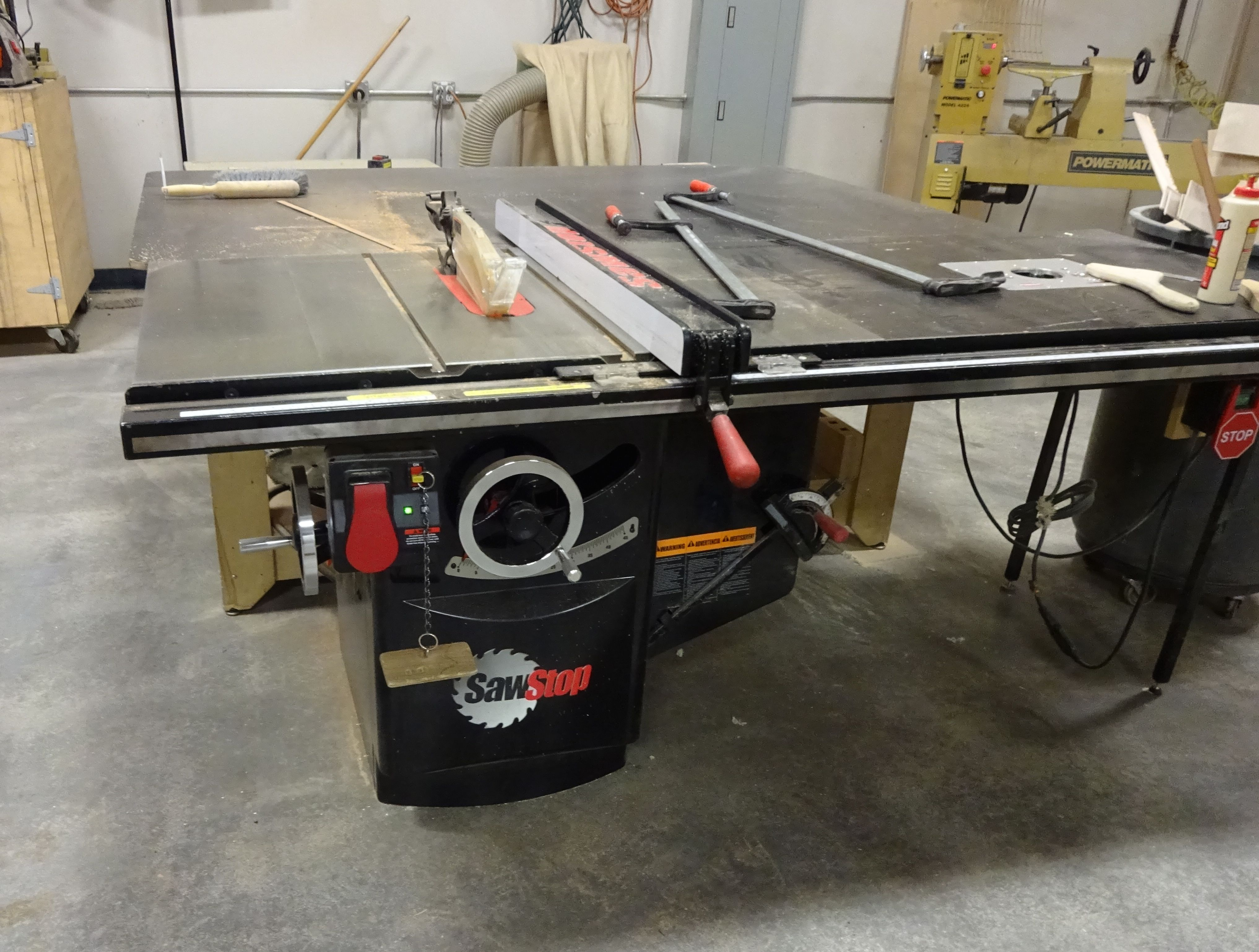
Saw Stop table saw used at former TechShop in Redwood City California

SawStop is an American table saw manufacturer headquartered in Tualatin, Oregon. The company was founded in 2000 to manufacture table saws that feature a patented automatic braking system that stops the blade upon contact with skin or flesh. This aims to minimize injuries that are relatively common when working with normal table saws. Sawstop announced in 2017 that it was purchased by TTS Tooltechnic Systems, owners of Festool and other brands.

== Mechanism ==
According to the manufacturer's website, the saw blade stops in less than five milliseconds, while angular momentum retracts the blade into the table. The operator suffers a minor injury instead of a serious one. The design takes advantage of the difference in conductance and capacitance between wood and flesh.

An oscillator generates a 12-volt, 200-kilohertz (kHz) pulsed electrical signal, which is applied to a small plate on one side of the blade. The signal is transferred to the blade by capacitive coupling. A plate on the other side of the blade picks up the signal and sends it to a threshold detector.

Replaceable braking cartridges
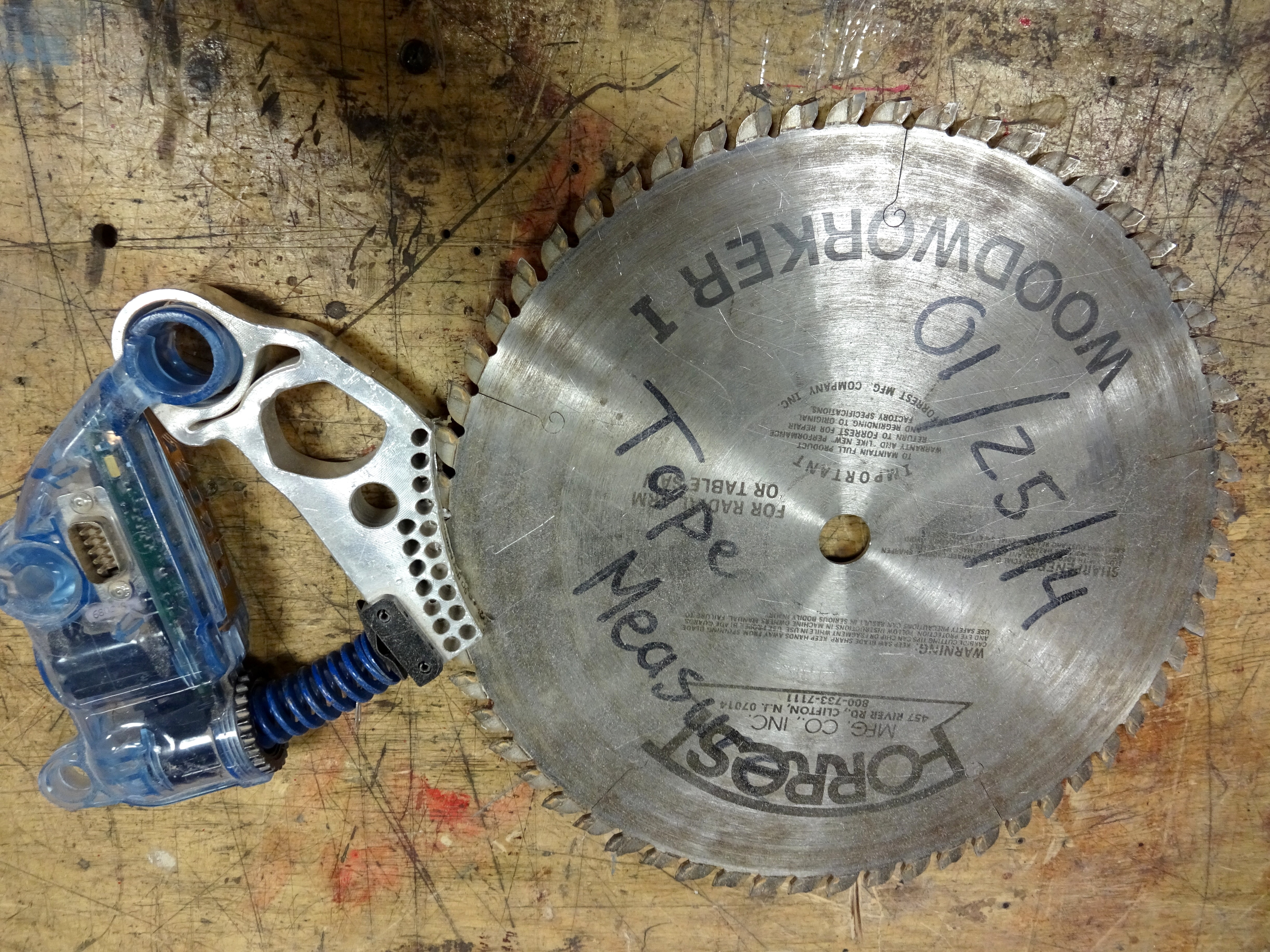
Cartridge and 10-inch, 36-tooth saw blade taken from a Saw Stop table saw after activation of safety mechanism

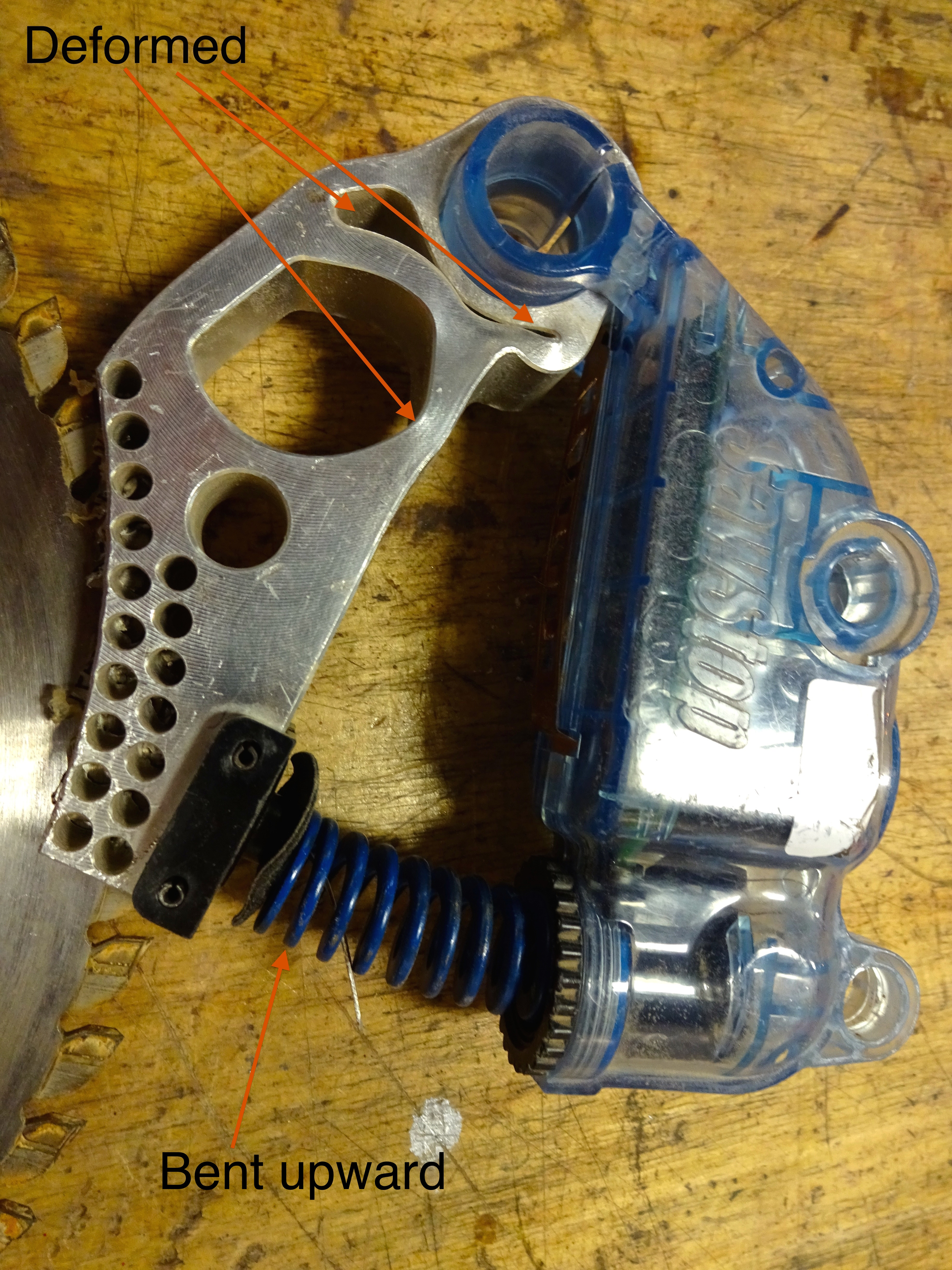
Saw braking cartridge after activation. The aluminum frame has been crushed as a result of impact by the moving saw blade, and the spring stretched.

If a human contacts the blade, the signal will fall below the threshold. After a signal loss lasting for 25 microseconds (μs), the detector fires. A tooth on a 10-inch circular blade rotating at 4000 RPM will stay in contact with a fingertip for about 100 μs. The 200-kHz signal will have up to 10 pulses during that time, and should be able to detect contact with just one tooth. When the brake activates, a spring pushes an aluminum block into the blade. The block is normally held away from the blade by a wire, but during braking an electric current instantly melts the wire, similar to a fuse blowing.

=== Limitations ===
According to SawStop, the system has restrictions and limitations:

- The braking system must be deactivated when cutting very green or wet timber.
- Non-conductive blades or blades with non-conductive hubs or teeth cannot be used.
- The braking system is designed to work with kerfs from 3/32″ to 3/16″; using thinner or thicker kerfs limits the saw's ability to stop the blade after accidental contact, likely resulting in more serious injury.
- It is impractical to retrofit into existing table saws.
- Activating the braking system usually damages the blade, and requires the replacement of a braking cartridge.

=== Drawings from SawStop patent applications ===
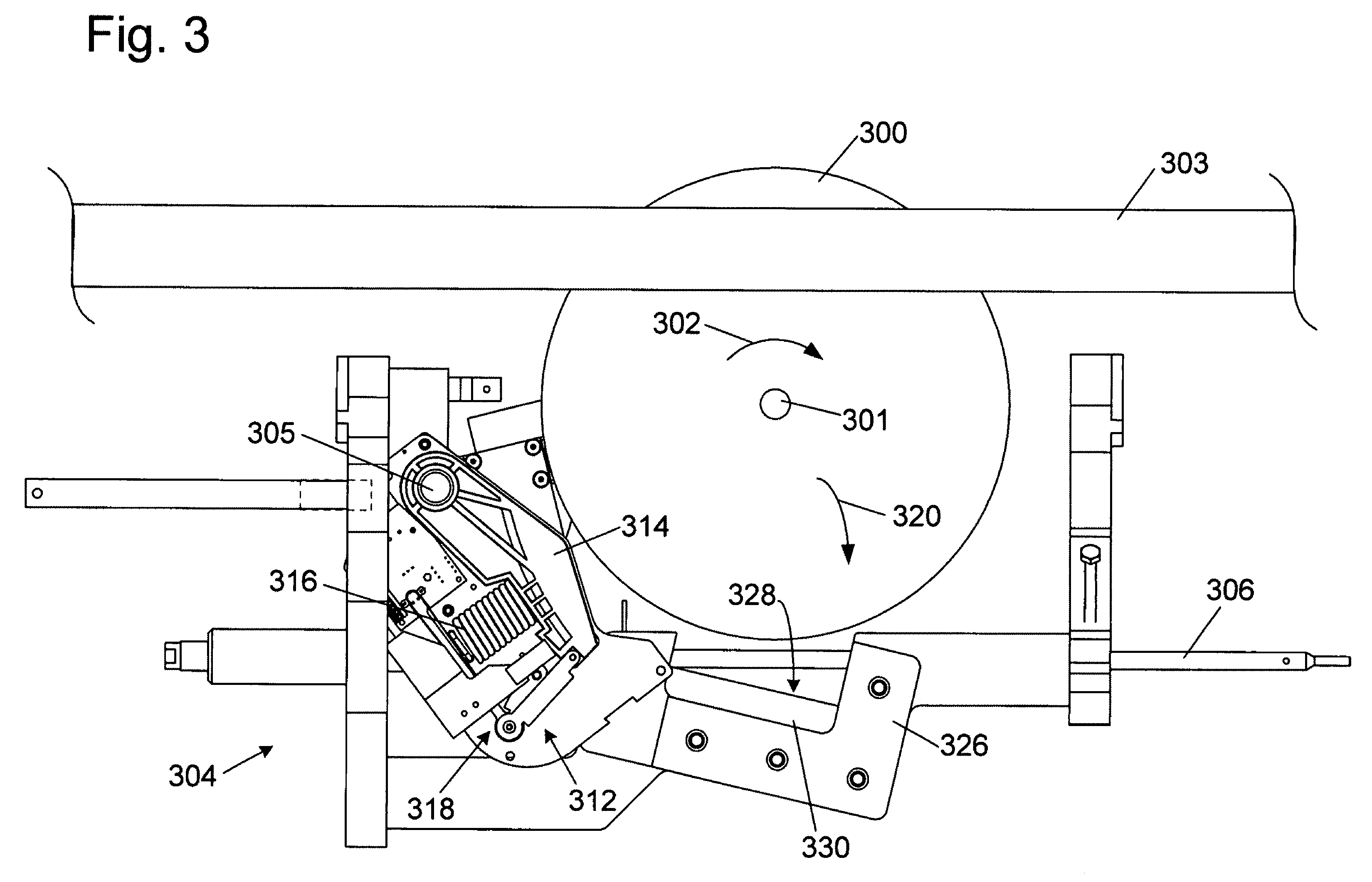
Left side of table saw

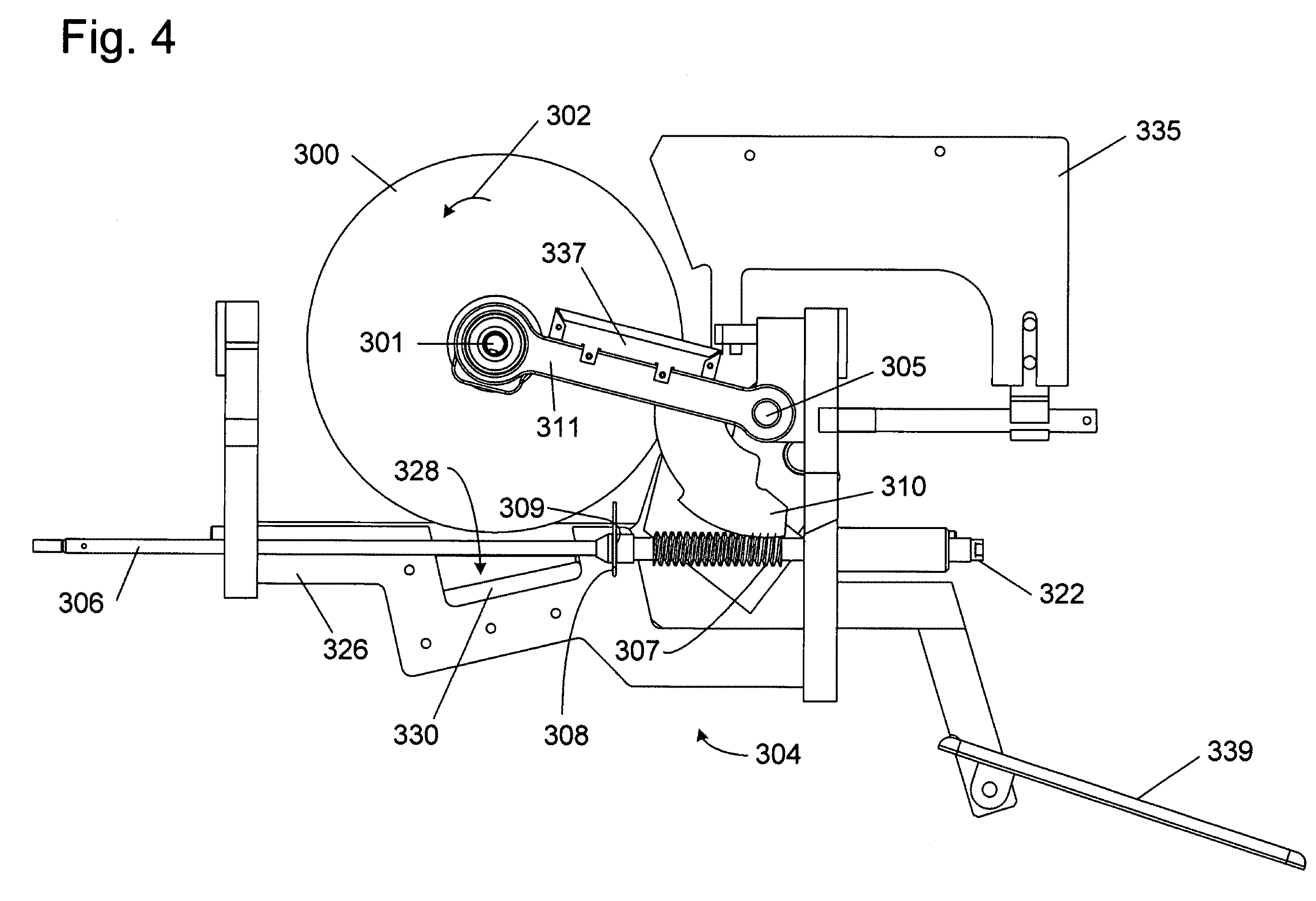
Right side of table saw, with table not shown

SawStop patent applications

== History ==
=== Invention (1999) ===
Steve Gass, a patent attorney and amateur woodworker with a doctorate in physics, came up with the idea for SawStop's braking system in 1999. It took Gass two weeks to complete the design, and a third week to build a prototype based on a "$200 secondhand table saw." After numerous tests using a hot dog as a finger-analog, in spring 2000, Gass conducted the first test with a real human finger: he applied Novocain to his left ring finger, and after two false starts, he placed his finger into the teeth of a whirring saw blade. The blade stopped as designed, and although it "hurt like the dickens and bled a lot," his finger remained intact.

=== Prototype and founding of company (2000) ===
SawStop, at the time consisting of "three guys out of a barn in Wilsonville", demonstrated a prototype in August 2000 at the International Woodworking Machinery and Furniture Supply Fair trade show. A series of meetings followed, in which Gass "negotiated with major players such as Ryobi, Delta, Black & Decker, Emerson, and Craftsman" in an attempt to license his invention; he followed those negotiations with a February 2001 presentation to the Defense Research Industry, a trade group for attorneys representing the power-tool industry.

Gass was immediately followed by a presentation from Dan Lanier, Black & Decker's national coordinating counsel. Lanier expressed concern that if any manufacture licensed the safety feature, all others would be forced to do likewise, or risk litigation following injuries with their products.

After hearing Lanier's presentation, Gass thought he was unlikely to succeed in convincing major power tool manufacturers to license SawStop technology.

In July 2001, SawStop was awarded a safety commendation by the US Consumer Product Safety Commission (CPSC) for "developing innovative safety technology for power saws intended to prevent finger amputations and other serious injuries." In 2002 Popular Science named SawStop's technology one of its "100 Best New Innovations."

=== Attempt to license (2002) ===
In January 2002, SawStop appeared to come close to a licensing agreement with Ryobi, who agreed to terms that involved no up-front fee and a 3% royalty based on the wholesale price of all saws sold with SawStop's technology; the royalty would grow to 8% if most of the industry also licensed the technology. According to Gass, when a typographical error in the contract had not been resolved after six months of negotiations, Gass gave up on the effort in mid-2002. Subsequent licensing negotiations were deadlocked when the manufacturers insisted that Gass should "indemnify them against any lawsuit if SawStop malfunctioned"; Gass refused because he would not be manufacturing the saws.

=== Start of manufacturing (2004) ===
The company's failure to license the technology to any manufacturer prompted SawStop to become a manufacturing company itself; over two years later, the company's first saw was produced by a Taiwanese manufacturing plant in November 2004. By 2005, SawStop had grown to "eight people out of a two-story barn Gass built himself."

Citing statistics showing that in the United States, accidents with table and bench saws resulted in 3000 amputations per year of one or more fingers, and asserting that such injuries could be minimized or eliminated using SawStop technology, Representative Kevin Joyce proposed the Illinois General Assembly's 2005 Electrical Saw Safety Act. The number of finger or hand amputations in the US has more recently been estimated to be 4000 annually, costing more than $2 billion a year to treat victims.

In June 2006, the CPSC recommended that the US government begin the rulemaking process that could result in mandatory safety standards for table saws.

=== Product liability litigation against Ryobi and other saw manufacturers (2006) ===
Gass served as an expert trial witness in 2006 when Carlos Osorio sued Ryobi for injuries sustained when he was injured using a Ryobi table saw. Osorio claimed the saw could have been made safer if it had used Gass's invention. Gass also worked with plaintiffs on other table saw lawsuits.

=== Opposition from trade group (2008) ===
SawStop has provoked opposition from the Power Tool Institute (PTI), which represents Black & Decker, Hilti, Hitachi Koki, Makita, Metabo, Bosch, Techtronic Industries (owner of Ryobi), and Walter Meier Holdings (WMH Tool Group, owner of JET and Powermatic). In April 2008, they told Congress that SawStop's braking system is:

- dangerous because it requires the user to come in contact with the blade before activating;
- unproven, particularly in terms of durability;
- prone to false trips caused by commonly available wet and green wood;
- potentially vulnerable to latent damage that cannot be inspected and may cause a hazard;
- costly to the user because once activated, saw blade and cartridge must be replaced; and
- significantly more expensive, costing at least 25 percent more than a standard saw and ranging upwards depending on saw type

The PTI objects to the licensing necessary due to the "more than 50 patents" related to SawStop's braking system; they say such costs "would destroy the market for the cheapest, most popular saws, adding $100 or more to the price of consumer models that typically sell for less than $200." In response, their members developed "new plastic guards to shield table saw users from the dangers of a spinning blade" and began selling models with that feature in 2007; as of May 2011, PTI says "its member companies have received no reports of injuries on [the 750,000] table saws with the new guard design."

The Power Tool Institute is also concerned that SawStop patented technology might force other manufacturers to pay unreasonable royalties to SawStop. The Institute also suggests that SawStop users have become less careful, because they have a "sense of security" in the ability of SawStop to protect them, a behavior called risk compensation.

=== Competition appears (2015) ===
Bosch began manufacturing a competing product, the Bosch REAXX Jobsite Table Saw, which also has finger-saving ability, but using a different technology. Bosch's new REAXX contractor's table saw appeared at the World of Concrete trade show in Las Vegas in February 2015. The Bosch saw retracts the blade below the table, but unlike SawStop, it does not stop or damage the blade.

Pro Tool Reviews published an article comparing the SawStop Jobsite Table Saw with the Bosch REAXX Jobsite Table Saw. They found both saws to be extremely well designed and built, and having many features desirable to contractors. They also found the SawStop made two minor scratches on a finger before stopping, and the Bosch safety saw made four minor scratches. Both saws seem able to save fingers.

=== Patent litigation (2016) ===
In September 2016, Judge Thomas B. Pender made an initial determination that the new Bosch design infringes on patents 7,895,927 and 8,011,279 held by SawStop, but does not infringe on two other SawStop patents, 7,225,712 and 7,600,455. In February 2017, the ruling entered a 60-day review period, giving attorneys time to comment before it would become final.

In a separate legal action, Bosch attempted to have the SawStop patents invalidated. On March 31, 2017, the Patent Trial and Appeal Board denied Bosch the institution of Inter Partes Review (IPR), thereby leaving the SawStop patents in force.

=== New ownership by TTS Holding (2017) ===
Since July 2017, SawStop has been owned by TTS Tooltechnic Systems Holding AG (Germany), which also owns Festool. Consequently, Festool offers saws with SawStop technology.

=== Patent expiration (2021) ===
The SawStop patents began to expire in September 2021. SawStop holds around 100 patents, though many of them are continuations of the early SawStop patents. The continuation patents may expire later than the "parent" patent due to patent office delays. Some SawStop continuation patents expire as late as May 2026. One patent was appealed and extended until 2033.

=== Intent to release patent (2023–2024) ===
On October 18, 2023 the U.S. Consumer Product Safety Commission (CPSC) voted to publish a Supplemental Notice of Proposed Rulemaking (SNPR) to address the Active Injury Mitigation (AIM) and what patents SawStop holds that may be affected.

In February 2024, in response to proposed rulemaking regarding table saw safety by the CPSC, SawStop committed to dedicate U.S. Patent 9,724,840 to the public upon the rule's effective date. In response to the SawStop announcement a Commissioner of the CPSC released a statement praising SawStop's gift to the public.

==== Availability ====
Since November 2024, SawStop is available in the United Kingdom and for the EU market with the launch of their Compact Table Saw and Jobsite Saw Pro.

== See also ==
- Riving knife
