= TechShop =

US chain of open-access workshops, 2006–2017

Coordinates: 37.48324°N 122.17798°W

- Formation: October 1, 2006 to November 26, 2018, 11 years 4 months 26 days
- Founder: Jim Newton, Ridge McGhee, and Robert Thomas
- Founded at: Menlo Park, California
- Dissolved: February 26, 2018; 8 years ago
- Legal status: For-profit corporation
- Purpose: Open-Access Workshop
- Headquarters: San Jose, California
- Services: Classes, events, access to workshops equipped with tools and state-of-the-art equipment and design software
- CEO: Dan Woods
- Website: web.archive.org/web/20171012090853/http://www.techshop.ws
- Remarks: Motto: Build your dreams here!

TechShop was a chain of membership-based, open-access, do-it-yourself (DIY) workshops and fabrication studios. As of 2017 they had ten locations in the United States, as well as four international locations.

TechShop offered safety and basic use training on all of its tools and equipment in addition to advanced and special interest classes and workshops. For most equipment, a safety and use class had to be completed before it could be used. It was affiliated with the maker culture and participated in annual Maker Faire events.

On November 15, 2017, with no warning, the company closed all domestic locations and announced it would declare bankruptcy under Chapter 7 of the U.S. bankruptcy code (immediate liquidation). An effort to purchase the company's assets and reopen the workshops fell through; however, the San Francisco location was reopened by a new owner on February 19, 2018. The original TechShop filed for bankruptcy a few days later, on February 26, 2018. Due to the continuing costs of litigation, the successor to TechShop also shut down in 2020. Many other maker spaces all over the world have sprung up in its place.

== History ==
TechShop was founded by Jim Newton, Ridge McGhee, and Robert Thomas. Jim Newton wanted to establish a place with tools to work on pet projects. Newton, who had been a science adviser to the TV show MythBusters and a College of San Mateo robotics teacher, was also motivated by his students' frustration with lack of access to equipment.

Ridge McGhee, a resident of Atherton, California, was upset by the loss of American manufacturing capability to other countries. After a highly successful donation drive, the first TechShop officially opened to the public on October 1, 2006, in Menlo Park, California. TechShop had over 9,000 active members and trained over 100,000 people through their skill building classes and STEAM youth programs.

=== Attempted expansions ===
While it was still in business, TechShop attempted to expand widely, by opening new shops in different cities. The day before they closed, their website showed they operated in 10 cities in the United States, with Brooklyn New York as the newest. At one time or another they operated in:

The US: Allen Park, Michigan; Arlington, Virginia; Beaverton, Oregon; Brooklyn, New York, Chandler, Arizona; Pittsburgh, Pennsylvania; Portland, Oregon; Redwood City, California; Round Rock, Texas; San Jose, California; San Francisco, California; Saint Louis, Missouri

Internationally: Abu Dhabi, United Arab Emirates; Lille, France; Paris, France; Tokyo, Japan

TechShop opened in Tokyo in 2015 and closed in February 2020.

=== Sudden closure ===
On November 15, 2017, with no formal warning, TechShop announced its immediate closure and planned Chapter 7 bankruptcy. The news instantly traveled as far as France. TechShop's locations outside of the United States are not affected and will remain open. TechShop filed bankruptcy on February 26, 2018.

=== Attempted acquisition ===
A group headed by Dan Rasure of Kansas announced in December 2017 that it was attempting to acquire the company's assets including secured debt and planned to reopen some of the TechShop locations under the name TechShop 2.0. That effort fell through. Rasure announced in February 2018 that he would reopen the downtown San Francisco location later that month and possibly also open a new San Jose location. His company, TechShop 2.0, was independent of the original TechShop.

=== Trademark dispute ===
On February 16, 2018, the original TechShop filed a lawsuit alleging tradename and trademark violations by the new company. The new company immediately changed its name to "TheShop.Build." A trial began on June 4, 2019, in Oakland, California. On June 12, 2019, the trial jury returned a verdict, finding that "TheShop" willfully infringed on Techshop's service mark, but also finding zero profit from the use, and no actual damages. Attorneys for the bankrupt Techshop indicated they will appeal the zero jury verdict. On March 9, 2020, Federal Judge Haywood S. Gilliam Jr. denied several plaintiff motions, including a request for a new trial. No more court filings occurred since March 17, 2020.

== Partnerships ==
A location in Metro Detroit opened on May 4, 2012, in a 38,000-square-foot facility in the suburb of Allen Park. This facility was launched in a partnership between Ford and software company Autodesk, and was the largest TechShop facility.

TechShop Austin-Round Rock, serving the metro Austin (Texas) area, opened on October 13, 2012. It was located adjacent to a Lowe's home improvement store and partnered with the chain to host workshops, supply tools, and provide materials.

TechShop opened a location in Chandler, Arizona, in partnership with Arizona State University on January 17, 2014. The first university-TechShop partnering was located at the ASU Chandler Innovation Center, an engineering and technology-based education and research hub located in downtown Chandler at the city's former public works yard at 249 E. Chicago Street.

Internationally, TechShop had partnership locations in Tokyo (with Fujitsu), the United Arab Emirates (with the Department of Education And Knowledge - ADEK), and Ivry (next to Paris), France (with ADEO Leroy Merlin).

Additional partnerships included Samsung, Instructables, Cortex, FutureWorks NYC, the U.S. Department of Veterans Affairs, National Instruments, and DARPA.

== Typical tools and equipment offered ==
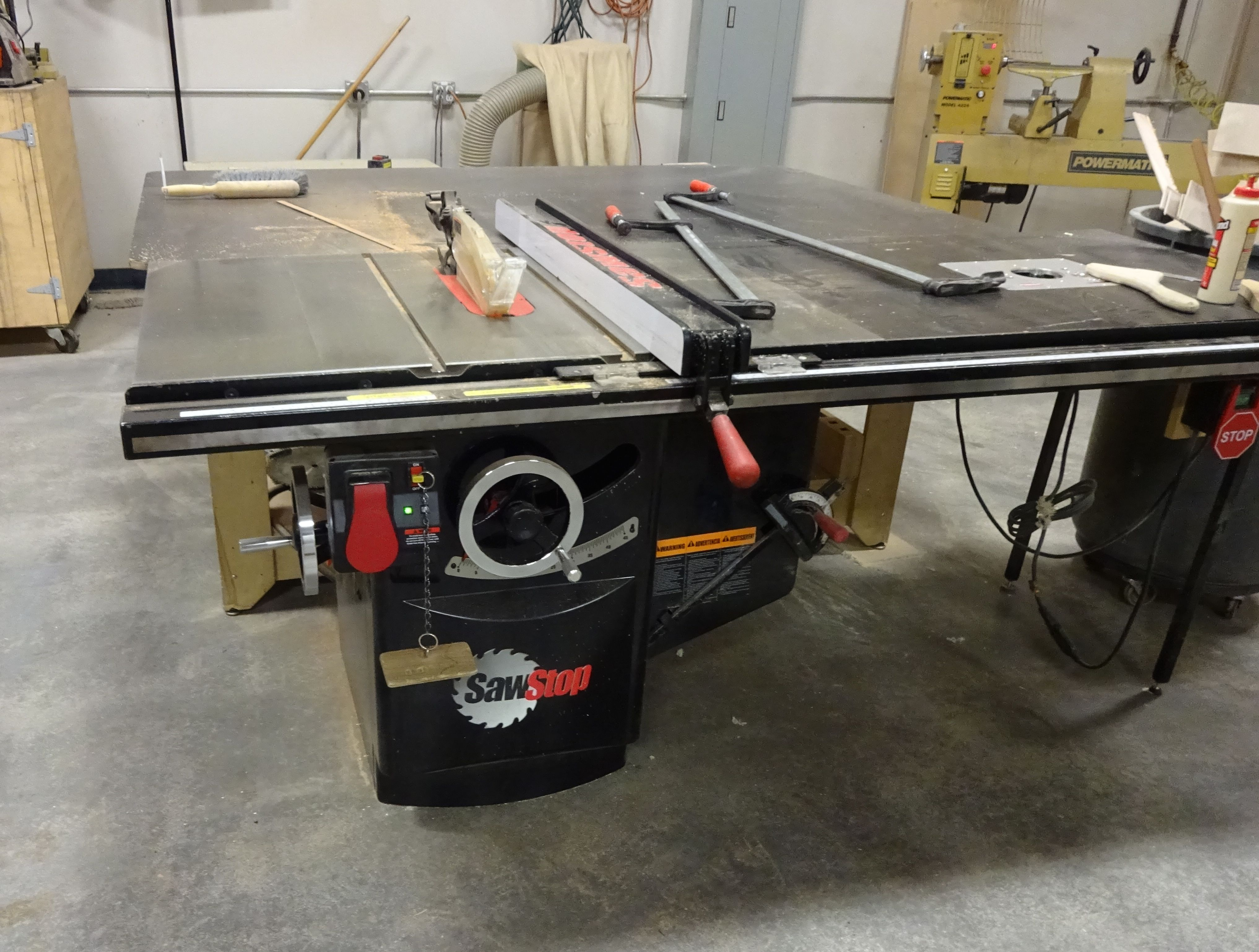
SawStop brand table saw used at TechShop in Redwood City California

- Table saw
- Power miter saw
- Abrasive saw
- Manual mills, Tormach 3 + 1 axis CNC mill, and metal lathes
- ShopBot 3 axis CNC router
- Welding equipment including MIG, TIG, gas, and arc welders
- Sheet metal fabrication equipment
- Oscilloscopes and other electronics equipment
- Equipment for working with plastics
- Laser cutter and engraver
- Entry-level 3D printers.
- Textiles area with home and industrial sewing machines
- STEAM lab for youth

== Alternatives ==
The sudden and unexpected closure of TechShop created a crisis for many small businesses and hobbyists who depended upon TechShop for the unique services it offered. In the scramble that followed, several alternatives were sought out or founded.

=== TheShop.build ===
For a while, TechShop in San Francisco reopened under the name "TheShop.build" by a new owner, Dan Rasure. Former TechShop members continued to use the reopened shop, but TechShop immediately filed suit for trade name infringement. A second location was opened in San Jose.

=== Gangplank ===
With the help of the city of Chandler, users created their own space called Gangplank. As of 2023 Gangplank continues to operate.

=== MADE Makerspace ===
In 2018 Block, Inc. founder, Jim McKelvey, purchased the equipment from the now defunct St. Louis TechShop, moved the makerspace to its new home on Delmar Blvd and invited the former TechShop members to continue their memberships now under MADE Makerspace (often shortened to just MADE). In 2025, MADE transitioned to a non-profit and continues serving the St. Louis area. In 2026, MADE expanded to open a maker retail space called The Front Room to allow members and local artists to sell their creations onsite.

=== Protohaven ===
In 2018, former members and staff of the Pittsburgh TechShop founded Protohaven.

=== Maker Nexus ===
In April 2019, former members and staff of the Redwood City and San Jose locations opened Maker Nexus in Sunnyvale, California as a non-profit makerspace.

=== ASU Chandler Innovation Center ===
In May 2023, the dual fabrication and event space was re-opened, managed by Arizona State University's Executive Administration department. It continues to be used as a free maker space for ASU students, staff, and faculty.
