= Stop block =

Milling and saw device

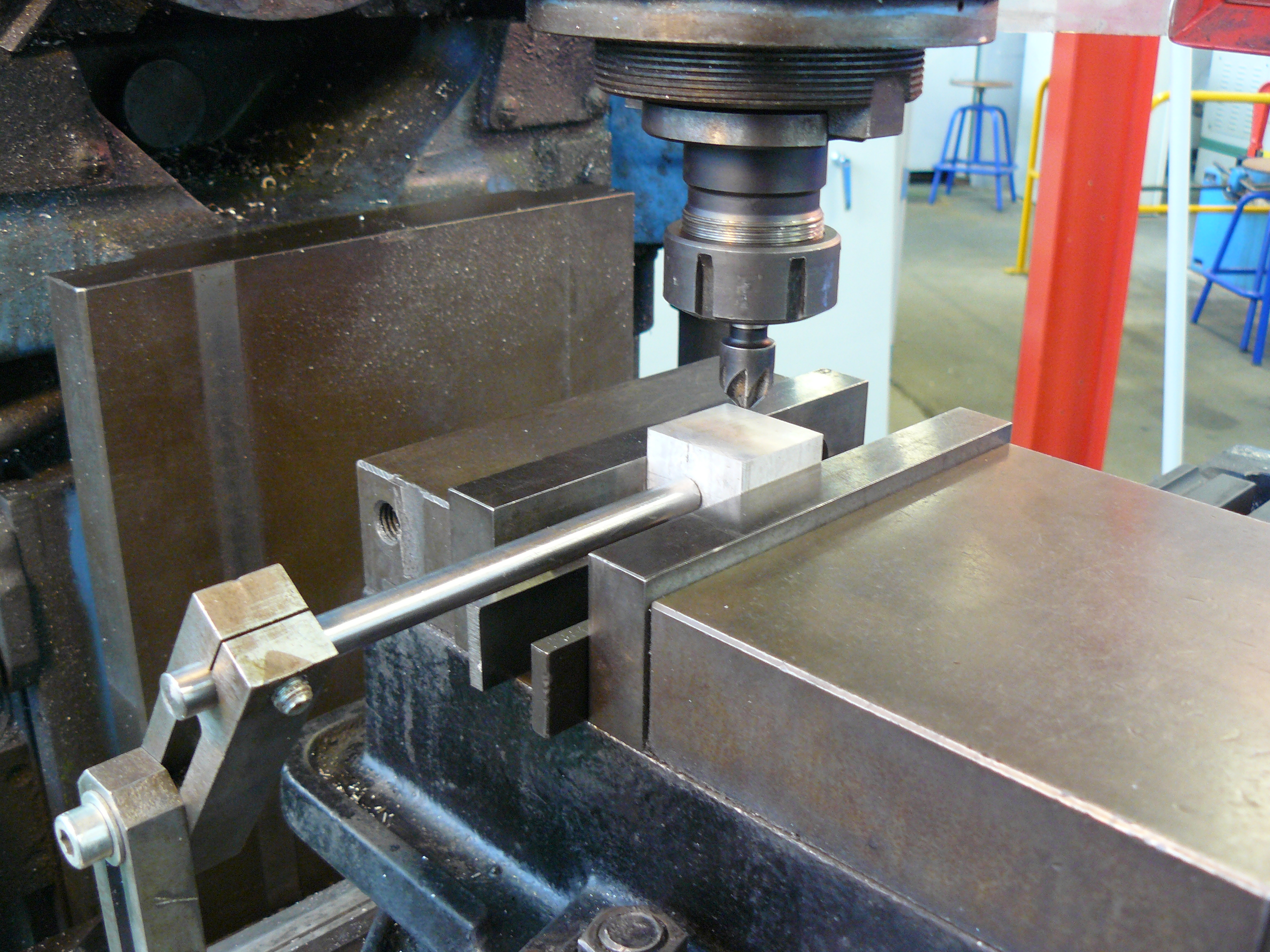
A stop block used in a milling machine

A stop block is a simple reusable jig used in metalworking and woodworking to locate a common edge of a workpiece so that multiple workpieces can get the same operation performed quickly. Common applications are table saws and manual milling machines, but they are also used on miter saws, band saws, radial arm saws, and abrasive saws.

Stop blocks used in metalworking usually have a small rod that slides parallel to the vice jaws and can be tightened in a particular position. Stop blocks in woodworking are typically nothing more than wood blocks clamped to a rip fence or auxiliary fence so that a distance from the saw blade can be maintained between cuts.
