= Radial arm saw =

Cutting machine

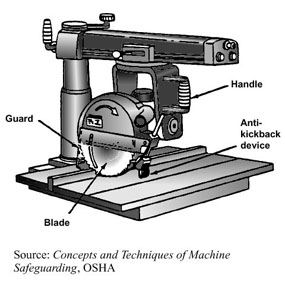
Radial Arm Saw

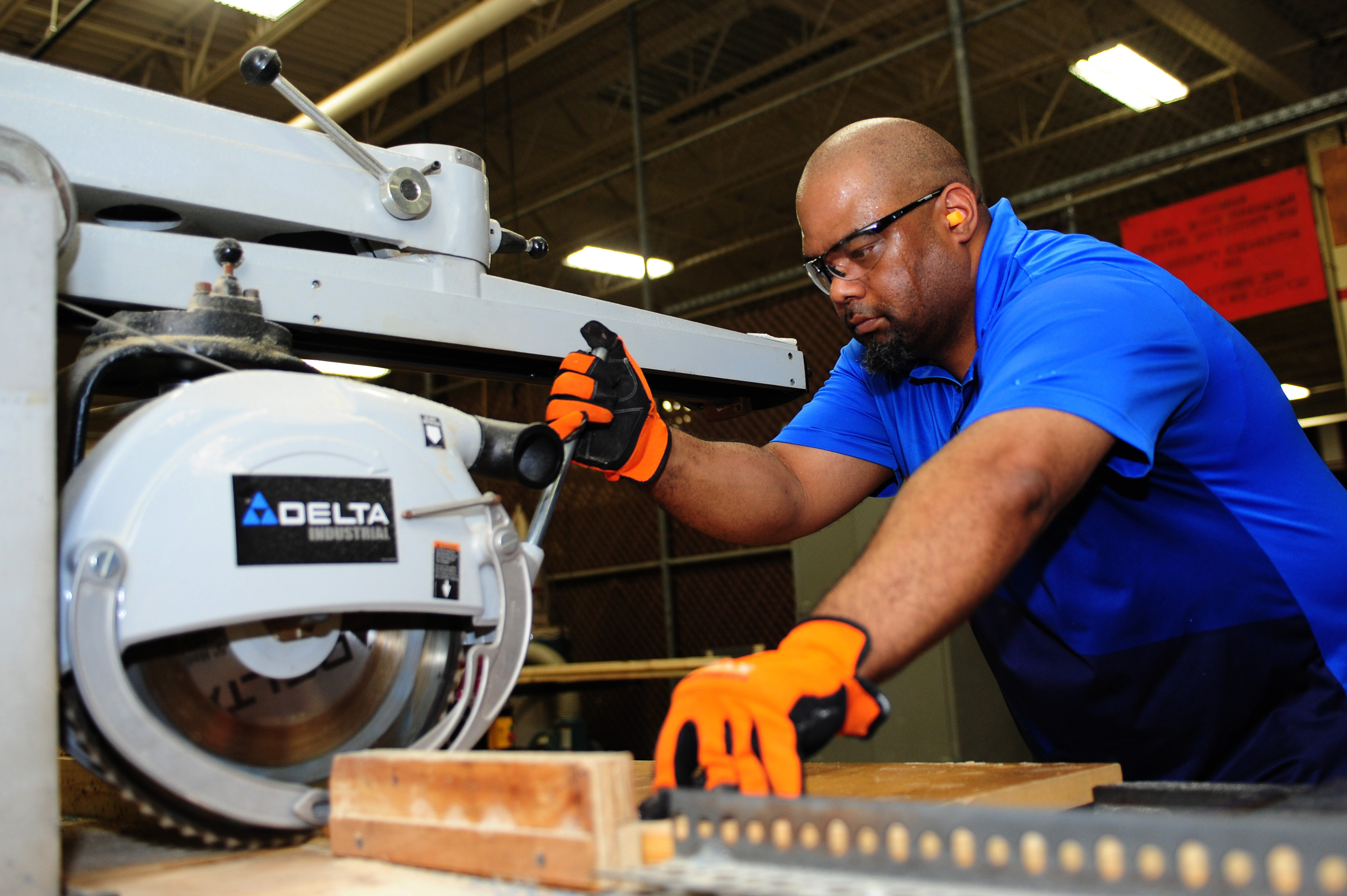

A radial arm saw is a cutting machine consisting of a circular saw mounted on a sliding horizontal arm. Invented by Raymond DeWalt in 1922, the radial arm saw was the primary tool used for cutting long pieces of stock to length until the introduction of the power miter saw in the 1970s.

In addition to making length cuts, a radial arm saw may be configured with a dado blade to create cuts for dado, rabbet or half lap joints. In addition some radial arm saws allow the blade to be turned parallel to the fence, allowing a rip cut to be performed.

== Origins ==
Unlike most types of woodworking machinery, the radial arm saw has a clear genesis: it was invented by Raymond DeWalt of Leola, Pennsylvania. DeWalt applied for patents in 1923, which were issued in 1925 (US Patent 1,528,536). DeWalt and others subsequently patented many variations on the original, but DeWalt's original design (sold under the moniker Wonder Worker) remained the most successful: a circular saw blade directly driven by an electric motor held in a yoke sliding along a horizontal arm that is some distance above a horizontal table surface. A saw which combines the sliding and compound features is known as a sliding compound miter saw (SCMS).

Before the advent of the radial arm saw, table saws and hand saws were most commonly used for crosscutting lumber. Table saws can easily rip stock, but it is awkward to push a long piece of stock widthwise through a table saw blade. In contrast, when a radial arm saw is used for crosscutting, the stock remains stationary on the saw's table, and the blade is pulled through it.

During the late 1970s, the compound miter saw began to replace the radial arm saw, but only for crosscuts and miter cuts since miter saws are unable to perform rip cuts. The radial arm saw can be less safe when used by an inexperienced or untrained operator, but is not as dangerous when used properly. In the hands of an experienced operator, the radial arm saw can safely cut compound miters necessary for picture and door frames, rip lumber precisely to width, cut tongues and grooves, and make variable dadoes. Like the compound miter saw, the radial arm saw can make these cuts with absolute precision, but is capable of making a wider variety of cuts, including more complex ones.

In the home shop the radial arm saw is an alternative to the table saw. Both machines can rip, crosscut, cut simple and compound miters, dado, mold or shape, make tenons, make open mortises, taper cut, and rabbet. The radial arm saw requires less clearance or space in the shop to handle long stock, since it only requires clearance on the sides, whereas a table saw needs clearance to the sides, in front and at the back. The radial saw is perfectly effective backed up against a wall, whereas the table saw needs to be placed in the center of the shop to give all around clearance. With some accessories the former can be used as a shaper, a disk or drum sander, a grinder, a surface planer, a router, a horizontal boring machine and even as a power unit for a lathe; whereas a table saw's secondary uses are limited to shaper and disk sander.

The major shortcoming of most current radial arm saws for home-use is that, most radial arm saws that have been built after the early 1960s are manufactured with stamped sheet metal parts and are machined to loose tolerances, hence they are not precise for doing accurate work without 'tuning'. A high-quality radial arm saw has carefully machined track arm ways and locking mechanisms, and a motor that runs very smoothly; under 'no-load' conditions most of the sound and vibration will originate from the whisper/whistling and the imbalance of the saw blade upon the arbor.

The saw tilts on all axes except vertical slope – see photo (all points of rotation are not clear in photo).

If machining depth cuts, the radial arm saw allows one to see the progress. With the (wood) clamped and using the arm (not hand feeding, which is also possible), the cuts are better machined and require no jig setup; the advantage is not widely needed however. Cutting full depth is less convenient, as the saw lowers into the table, cutting the table (often a wood table for that reason).

"Top cutting" machined saw table with differing axis designs are still made and sold.

== Safety ==
Power saws can easily cut off fingers. Furthermore, a dull blade will grab lumber with enough force to kick it through a wall. A new blade has less tendency to grab but still requires proper feeding.

Radial arm saws are safer with a blade with a very low or negative hook angle, to inhibit overly fast feed rate, binding, and the blade's tendency to try to "climb" the material. Also, a 10 degree positive hook blade with a "triple chip profile" works well on the radial arm saw and can be considered a universal blade. If the saw climbs with this blade, the yoke roller bearings need to be adjusted and tightened.

== Occupational Safety and Health Association (OSHA) Requirements in the United States ==
According to OSHA regulation 1910.213(h)(1): The upper hood shall completely enclose the upper portion of the blade down to a point that will include the end of the saw arbor. The upper hood shall be constructed in such a manner and of such material that it will protect the operator from flying splinters, broken saw teeth, etc., and will deflect sawdust away from the operator. The sides of the lower exposed portion of the blade shall be guarded to the full diameter of the blade by a device that will automatically adjust itself to the thickness of the stock and remain in contact with stock being cut to give maximum protection possible for the operation being performed.
