= Raymond DeWalt =

American inventor

Raymond Elmer DeWalt (October 9, 1885 – May 8, 1961) was an American inventor and entrepreneur, who invented the radial arm saw in 1922. In 1924, he founded DeWALT Products Company in Leola, Pennsylvania, to manufacture and sell the "Wonder-Worker" (his name for the radial arm saw). As the company was reaching an early pinnacle of success, he sold it to found a religious communal order. He later went on to become a shop teacher at Mechanicsburg High school. He was born in Oakville Cumberland County, Pennsylvania and died in Mechanicsburg.
