= Featherboard =

Woodworking safety device

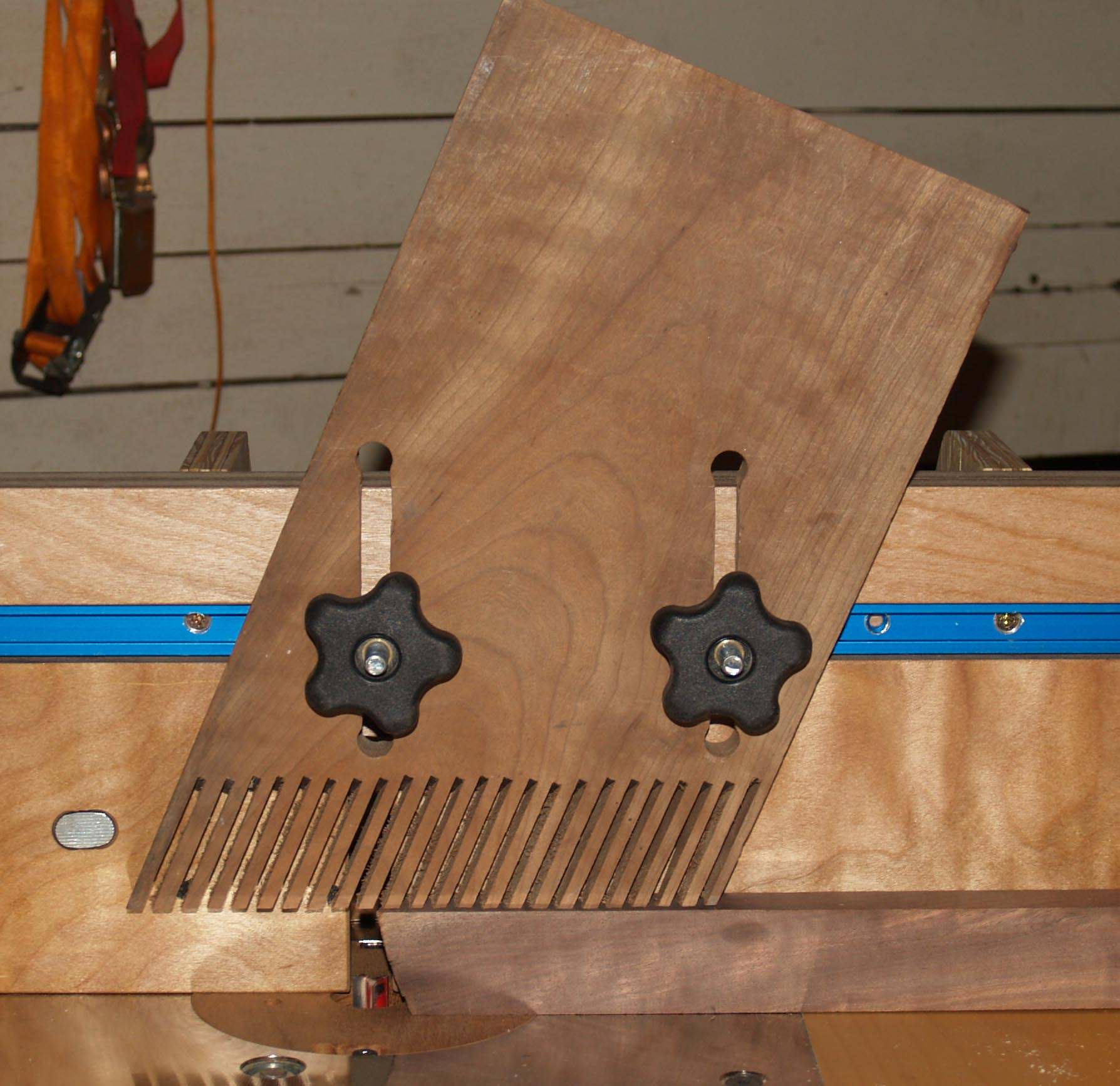
A shop-made featherboard

A featherboard is a safety device used when working with stationary routers or power saws such as table saws or bandsaws. The purpose of a featherboard is to apply pressure against a workpiece, keeping it flat against a machine table or fence.

Featherboard shapes and sizes vary depending on the tasks for which they are intended. A serviceable featherboard can be shop-fabricated from an approximately 3/4 × 3 × 11 inch piece of straight grained, defect-free wood cut crosswise at a 45-degree angle on one end. Several parallel cuts in the direction of the grain create fingers or "feathers" that flex in the direction of workpiece travel, preventing the workpiece from being dragged backwards by blade friction.

Featherboards are also useful for edge jointing, and making moulding on router tables.

== See also ==
- Riving knife – Safety device installed on woodworking saws
