= Push stick =

Woodworking safety device

A push stick, push shoe, or push block is a safety device used when working with stationary routers, jointers, or power saws such as table saws or bandsaws. The purpose of a push stick is to help the user safely maneuver a workpiece, keeping it flat against a machine table or fence while it is being cut.

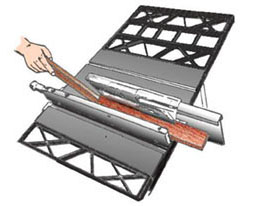
When ripping narrow stock, a push stick or block is used to prevent the operator getting too close to the blade.

== Types of push sticks ==
There are several different categories of push sticks, and many people adapt their own designs.

- Push shoes are push devices categorized by a long section to gain more control over the workpiece, and are typically L-shaped.
- Push stick can be a general term to refer to all push devices, or to a specific type categorized by a long handle with a notch in the end.

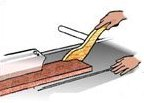
A long push stick, used for pushing narrow stock through a table saw

- Push blocks typically are made from a thick block of wood with a handle and a hook on the back to hold onto the workpiece.
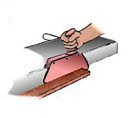
  A push block, used on a table saw
- Push pads typically consist of one or two handles and a flat pad with a rubber underside to increase friction with the workpiece. They are typically used with jointers and router tables.
- Microjig's GRR-Ripper is a hybrid push device that combines characteristics of a push block with a push pad. It uses an adjustable base which allows it to straddle a table saw blade or be used as a push pad.
