= Miter gauge =

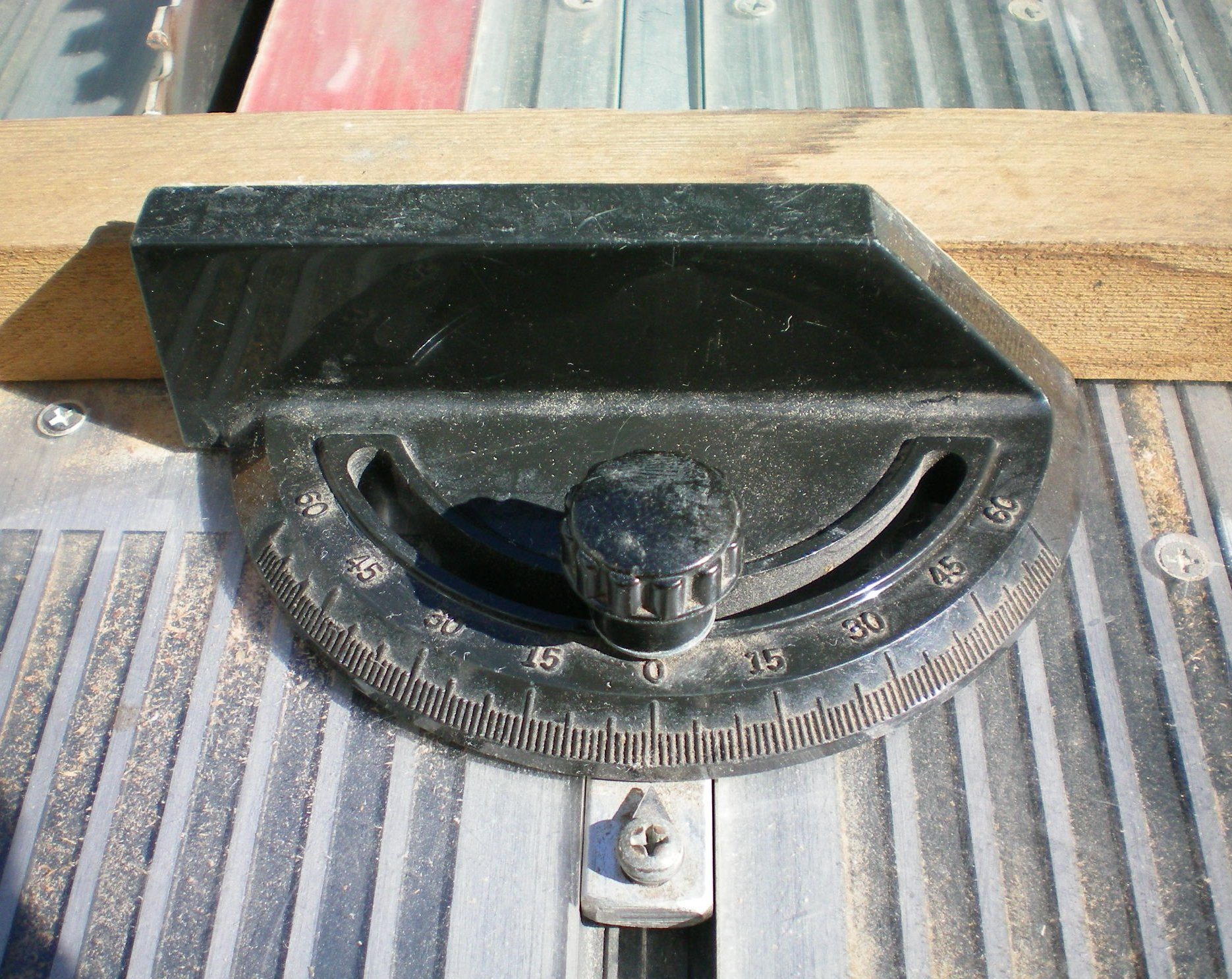
A simple miter gauge

A miter gauge is a device used for holding workpieces at a set angle while being cut on table saws, band saws or sanded on stationary disk sanders. The miter gauge slides in a slot on the worktable (known as a miter slot) on the machine being used. Typically, the miter gauge and the workpiece are held together by hand and moved across the worktable making the cut (or sanded edge). There are more sophisticated miter gauges which have the ability to clamp the workpiece or have adjustable stops for repetitive machining of workpieces.
