= Coffin lock =

Stage scenery connector

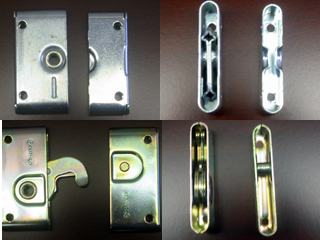
Views of a few types of coffin lock

Coffin lock is a slang term for a blind panel connector (also called a butt-joint fastener) often used in scenic construction to join together stage decks or scenery in a butt joint. These are two part connectors (male and female) that draw together and lock. The two most common types are the cam and acceptor and more traditional hook and pin version. These devices generally use a hex key to operate the locking mechanism via a small diameter hole either through the face or rear of the panel. When locked, the considerable mechanical advantage offered by the cam or hook holds the panels tightly together. Coffin locks can be installed directly into a mortise cut into each panel for total concealment except for the locking hole or mounted to the rear of the panels. Many small theatres use stock platforms with coffin locks built into the frames.
