= Dado set =

Circular saw blade for woodworking

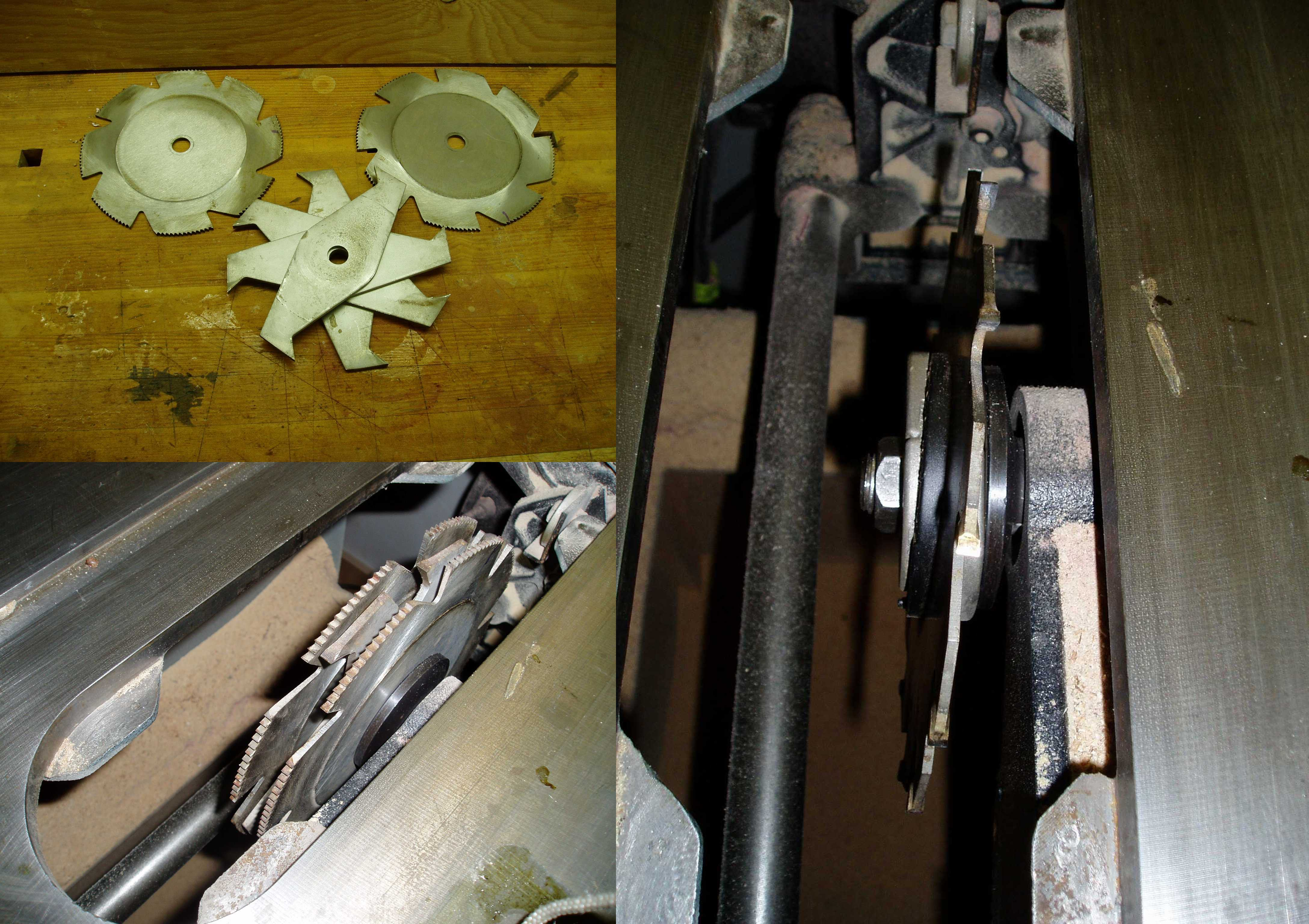
Top left: disassembled stacked dado set showing blades and chippers; bottom left: stacked dado set in table saw; right: wobble dado

A dado set or dado blade is a type of circular saw blade, typically used with a table saw or radial arm saw, which is used to cut dadoes or grooves in woodworking. There are two common kinds of dado sets, stacked dado set and wobble blade.

A stacked dado set consists of two circular saw blades fixed on either side of a set of removable chippers. As the dado set spins, the two outside blades cut the dado walls and the chippers remove the waste material in between and smooth the bottom of the dado. The chippers are added or removed to the set as required to make a dado of the desired width. Chippers can also be interspersed with spacers to finely adjust the dado width. Consequently, changing the dado width requires the complete removal of the dado blade set from the arbor. After disassembly, chippers and/or spacers are used to achieve the desired width of the dado set.

Wobble blade or wobble dado or adjustable dado consists of a circular blade mounted on an adjustable multi-piece hub, that varies the angle of the blade to the arbor shaft. The width of the dado cut increases as the angle gets further from the radial normal (90°) to the arbor. While it is possible to adjust the thickness of the cut when the saw is mounted on the arbor, accurate adjustment is usually difficult because tightening the arbor nut often changes the adjustment. Also, because of their inherent geometry, wobble blades can only produce a flat-bottomed dado at one width setting, which may be a disadvantage in certain joinery operations. Another disadvantage of a wobble dado over stacked dado is undesirable vibrations. The magnitude of these vibrations varies with the blade's angular offset. In other words, the wider the dado, the stronger the vibrations. Dado cuts are also less likely to wear down over time, given that they are primarily designed to hold an inserted workpiece entirely still.
