= Yato =

Yato is a surname. Notable people with the name include:

- Peceli Yato (born 1993), Fijian rugby player
- Tamotsu Yato (1928(?)–1973), Japanese photographer and occasional actor

== See also ==
- Yato Dharma Tato Jaya, is a Sanskrit shloka
- Yato-no-kami, are snake deities in Japanese folklore appearing in the Hitachi no Kuni Fudoki
