= Table saw =

Woodworking tool

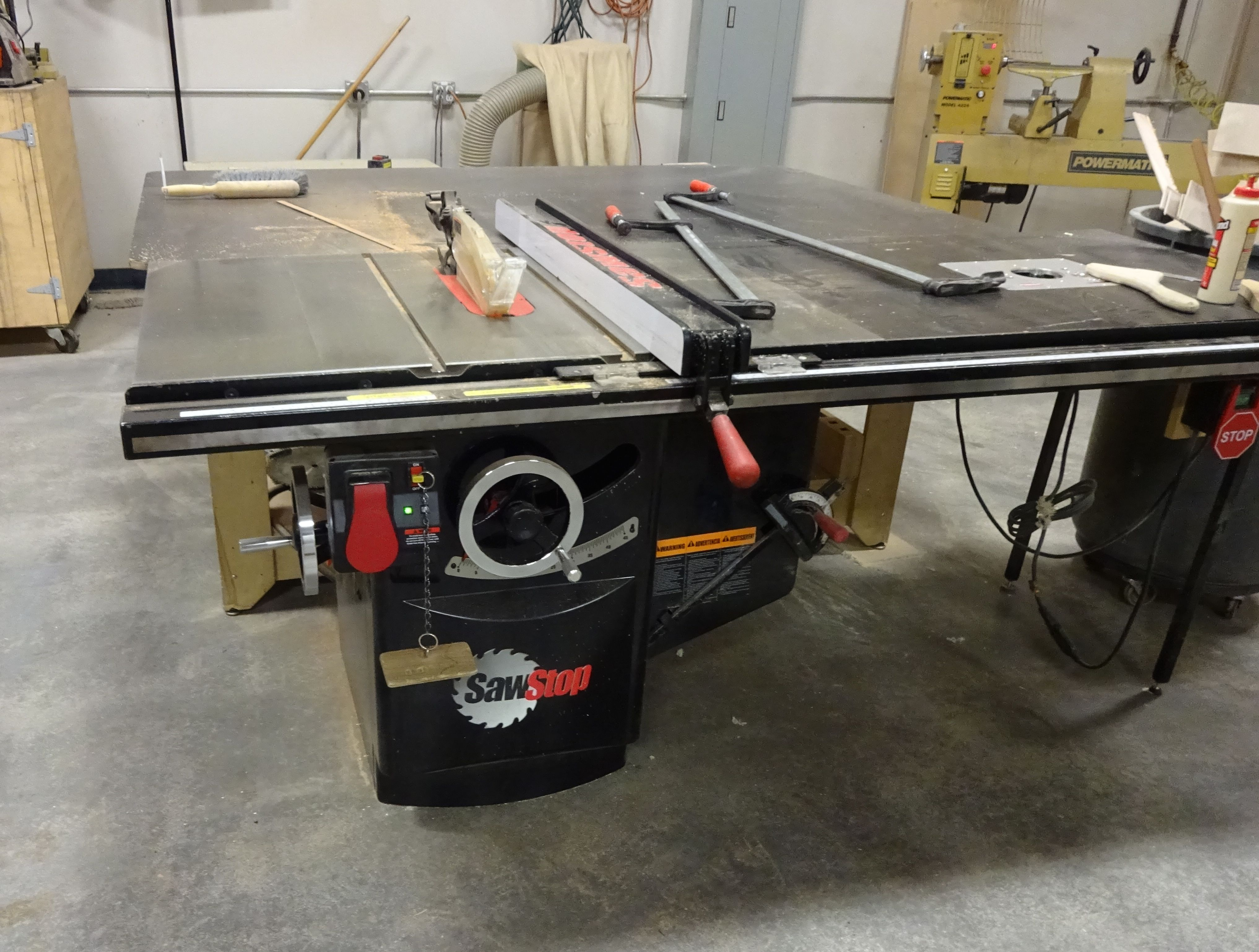
- A cabinet table saw, equipped for cutting large pieces of sheet stock in the direction of the wood's grain (also known as ripping)
- Other names: Sawbench
- Classification: Power tool
- Manufacturer: Delta, Crown, Yato, SawStop, Milwaukee, Skilsaw, Bosch, Makita, Ryobi, Black & Decker/DeWalt, among others

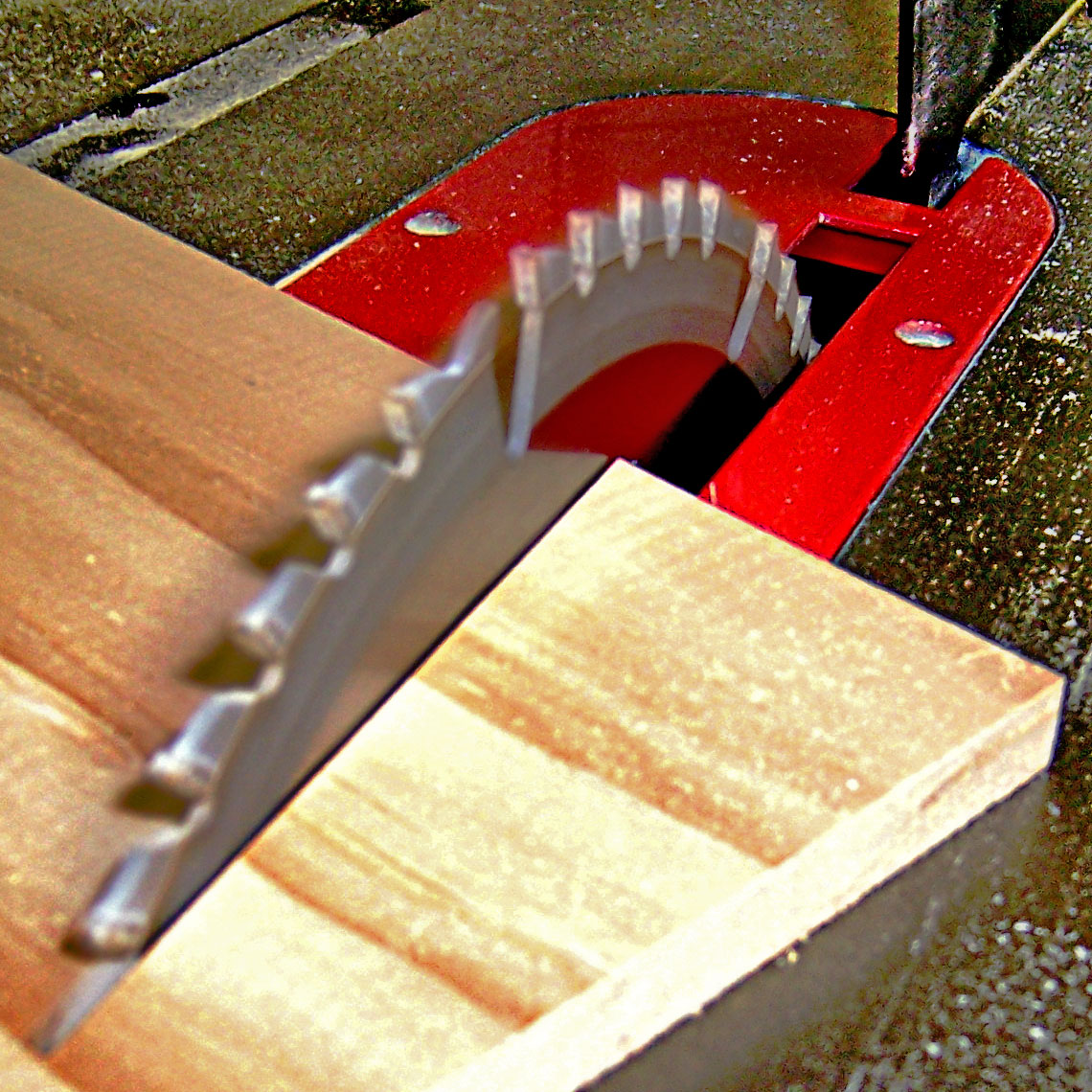
The blade of a table saw cutting into wood

A table saw (also known as a sawbench or bench saw in England) is a woodworking tool, consisting of a circular saw blade, mounted on an arbor, that is driven by an electric motor (directly, by belt, by cable, or by gears). The drive mechanism is mounted below a table that provides support for the material, usually wood, being cut, with the blade protruding up through the table into the material.

In most modern table saws, the table is fixed and the blade position can be adjusted. Moving the blade up or down affects the depth of the cut by controlling how much of the blade is protruding above the table surface. Many saws also have an adjustable angle, where the blade can be tilted relative to the table. Table saws with tilted capability can tilt to either the right or to the left. Some earlier saws instead had a fixed blade and the table could be adjusted for height (exposure of blade) and angle relative to the blade.

== Types ==
The general types of table saws are compact, benchtop, jobsite, contractor, hybrid, cabinet, and sliding table saws.

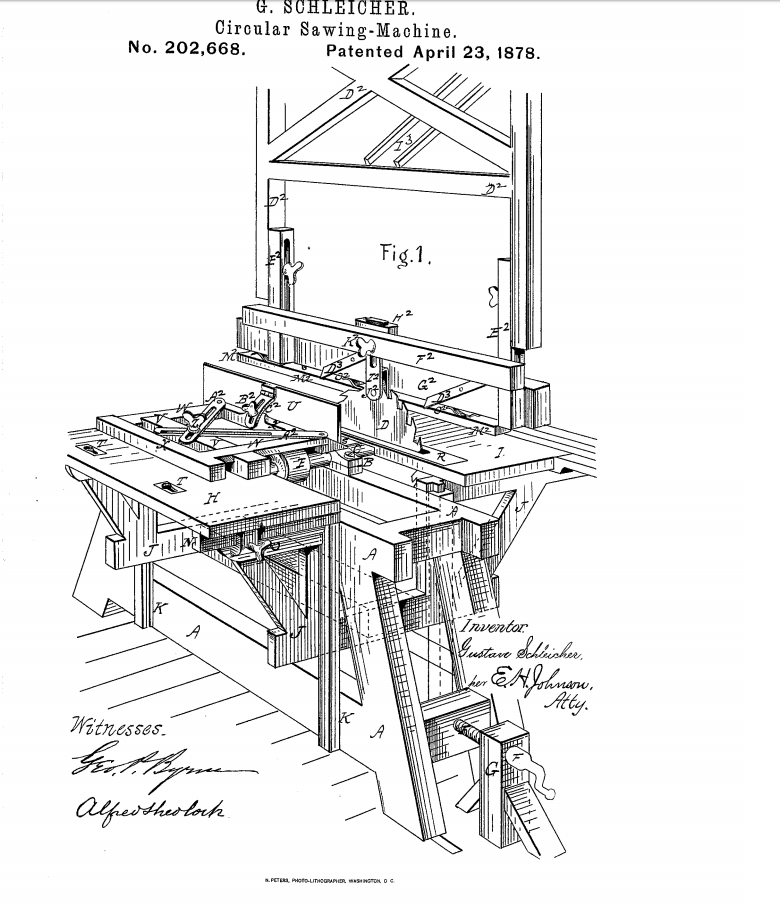
A table saw patent filed in 1878

=== Benchtop ===
Benchtop table saws are lightweight and are designed to be placed on a table or other support for operation. This type of saw is most often used by homeowners and DIYers. They almost always have a direct-drive (blade driven directly by the motor) universal motor. Some early models used small induction motors, which weren't very powerful, made the saw heavy, and caused a lot of vibration. Most modern saws can be lifted and carried by one person. These saws often have parts made of steel, aluminum and plastic and are designed to be compact and light.

Benchtop table saws are the least expensive (typically costing in the $100-$200 range) and least capable of the table saws; however, they can offer adequate ripping capacity and precision for most tasks. The universal motor is not as durable or as quiet as an induction motor, but it offers more power relative to its size and weight. The top of a benchtop table saw is narrower than those of the contractors and cabinet saws, so the width of stock that can be ripped is reduced. Another restriction results from the top being smaller from the front of the tabletop to the rear. This results in a shorter rip fence, which makes it harder to make a clean, straight cut when ripping. Also, there is less distance from the front edge of the tabletop to the blade, which makes cross cutting stock using a miter more difficult (the miter and/or stock may not be fully supported by the table in front of the blade). Benchtop saws are the smallest type of table saw and have the least mass, potentially resulting in increased vibration during a cut. Nowadays, these models are being phased out for more practical jobsite model saws.

=== Jobsite ===
Jobsite table saws are slightly larger than benchtop models, and usually are placed on a folding or stationary stand during operation. These saws are mostly used by carpenters, contractors, and tradesman on the jobsite (hence the name). Many of these saws are more expensive than benchtop saws (typically in the $300–$600 range). Most saws in this category have small but powerful 15-ampere universal motors. Many higher-end saws have gear-driven motors. Most of these saws are relatively light, and can be easily transported to a job location. Many of these saws are built more ruggedly and are generally more accurate than the entry-level benchtop models. The motors, gears, and cases are generally designed to better withstand the abuse of construction sites. When compared to benchtop saws, many jobsite models have 3/4-inch (19 mm) miter slots, better fences, better overall alignment, sliding extension tables, larger rip capacities, and folding stands with wheels.

=== Compact ===
Compact table saws are much larger than portable saws, and sit on a stationary stand. The motor is still a universal type motor, however these are usually driven by small toothed belts. Some saws have cast iron tops, and are similar in appearance to larger contractor saws, although the tables are usually smaller and the build is of lighter construction. Some models even feature sliding-miter tables, with a built-in miter sled that could be tilted to many different angles.

=== Contractor ===
Contractor table saws (also sometimes referred to as open-stand saws) are heavier (200–400 pounds [90–180 kg]), larger saws that are attached to a stand or base, often with wheels. On these saws, the motor (Usually a 1 to 2 hp [0.75 to 1.5 kW] induction-type motor) hinges off the rear of the saw on a pivoting bracket (although direct drive models have existed) and drives the blade with one, or rarely, two rubber v-belts. This is the type often used by hobbyists and homeowners because standard electrical circuits provide adequate power to run them, and because of their generally low cost when compared to larger saws. Because the motor hangs off the rear of the saw, dust collection is usually problematic or even ineffective.

Contractor saws were originally designed to be somewhat portable, often having wheels, and were frequently brought to job sites before the invention of smaller bench-top models in the early 1980s. Contractor saws are heavier than bench-top saws, but are still lightweight when compared to cabinet saws. Their larger size and greater power allows them to be used for larger projects and allows them to be more durable, accurate, and longer-lasting then bench-top saws.

=== Cabinet ===
Cabinet table saws are heavy (600–900 pounds [270–410 kg]), using large amounts of cast iron and steel, to minimize vibration and increase accuracy.

A cabinet saw is characterized by having an enclosed base. Cabinet saws usually have induction motors in the 3-to-5 hp (2.2-to-3.7 kW) range, single-phase, but motors in the 5-to-7.5 hp (3.7-to-5.6 kW) range, three-phase, are common in commercial/industrial sites. For home use, this type of motor typically requires that a heavy-duty circuit be installed. The motor is enclosed within the cabinet and drives the blade with one or more parallel V-belts, often "A" belts as "A" belts may be ganged without having to be specially selected (otherwise, specially selected sets of light-duty "4L" belts are used). Cabinet saws offer the following advantages over contractor saws: heavier construction for lower vibration and increased durability; a cabinet-mounted trunnion (the mechanism that incorporates the saw blade mount and allows for height and tilt adjustment); improved dust collection due to the totally enclosed cabinet and common incorporation of a dust collection port. Cabinet saws are designed for, and are capable of very high duty-cycles, such as are encountered in commercial/industrial applications. Where some of the advantages of a cabinet saw are desired in a home shop application, so-called "hybrid" saws have emerged to address this need.

Cabinet saws have an easily replaceable insert around the blade in the table top allowing the use of zero-clearance inserts, which greatly reduce tear out on the bottom of the workpiece. It is common for this type of saw to be equipped with a table extension that increases ripping capacity for sheet goods to 50 inches (1.3 m). These saws are characterized by a cast iron top on a full-length steel base, generally square in section, with radiused corners. Two 3/4-inch-wide (19 mm) miter slots (1 inch [25 mm] wide on the largest saws) are located parallel to the blade, one to the left of the blade and one to the right.

American-style cabinet saws generally follow the model of the Delta Unisaw, a design that has evolved since 1939. Saws of this general type are made in the US, Canada, Taiwan and China. The most common type of rip fence mounted to this type of saw is characterized by the standard model made by Biesemeyer (now a subsidiary of Delta). It has a sturdy, steel T-type fence mounted to a steel rail at the front of the saw and replaceable laminate faces. American cabinet saws are normally designed to accept a 13/16-inch-wide (21 mm) stacked dado blade in addition to a standard saw blade. The most common size of blade is 10 inches (250 mm) in diameter with a blade arbor diameter of 5/8 inch (16 mm), but 12 or 14 inches (300 or 360 mm) in diameter with a blade arbor diameter of 1 inch (25 mm) are found in commercial/industrial sites. American saws normally include an anti-kickback device that incorporates a splitter or riving knife, toothed anti-kickback pawls, and a clear plastic blade cover. The saw blade can tilt to either the left side or right side of the saw, depending on the model of saw. The original Delta Unisaw and early cabinet saws based on it are all right-tilt units while newer Delta Unisaws and many competitive cabinet saws made after 2000 are left-tilt saws. The change to left-tilt was due to a lower perceived propensity for the cut piece to become trapped between the rip fence and blade and kick back when the blade tilts away from the rip fence (left-tilt saw) versus towards the rip fence (right-tilt saw.)

=== Hybrid ===
Hybrid table saws are designed to compete in the market with high-end contractor table saws. They offer some of the advantages of cabinet saws at a lower price than traditional cabinet saws. Hybrid saws on the market today offer an enclosed cabinet to help improve dust collection. The cabinet can either be similar to a cabinet saw with a full enclosure from the table top to the floor or a shorter cabinet on legs. Some hybrid saws have cabinet-mounted trunnions and some have table-mounted trunnions. In general, cabinet-mounted trunnions are easier to adjust than table-mounted trunnions. Hybrid saws tend to be heavier than contractor saws and lighter than cabinet saws. Some hybrid saws offer a sliding table as an option to improve cross cutting capability. Hybrid saw drive mechanisms vary more than contractor saws and cabinet saws. Drive mechanisms can be a single v-belt, a serpentine belt or multiple v-belts. Hybrid saws have a 1.5-or-2 hp (1.1-or-1.5 kW) motor and thus the ability to run on a standard 15- or 20-ampere 120-volt North American household circuit, while a cabinet saw's 3 hp (2.2 kW) or larger motor requires a 240-volt supply.

=== Mini and micro ===
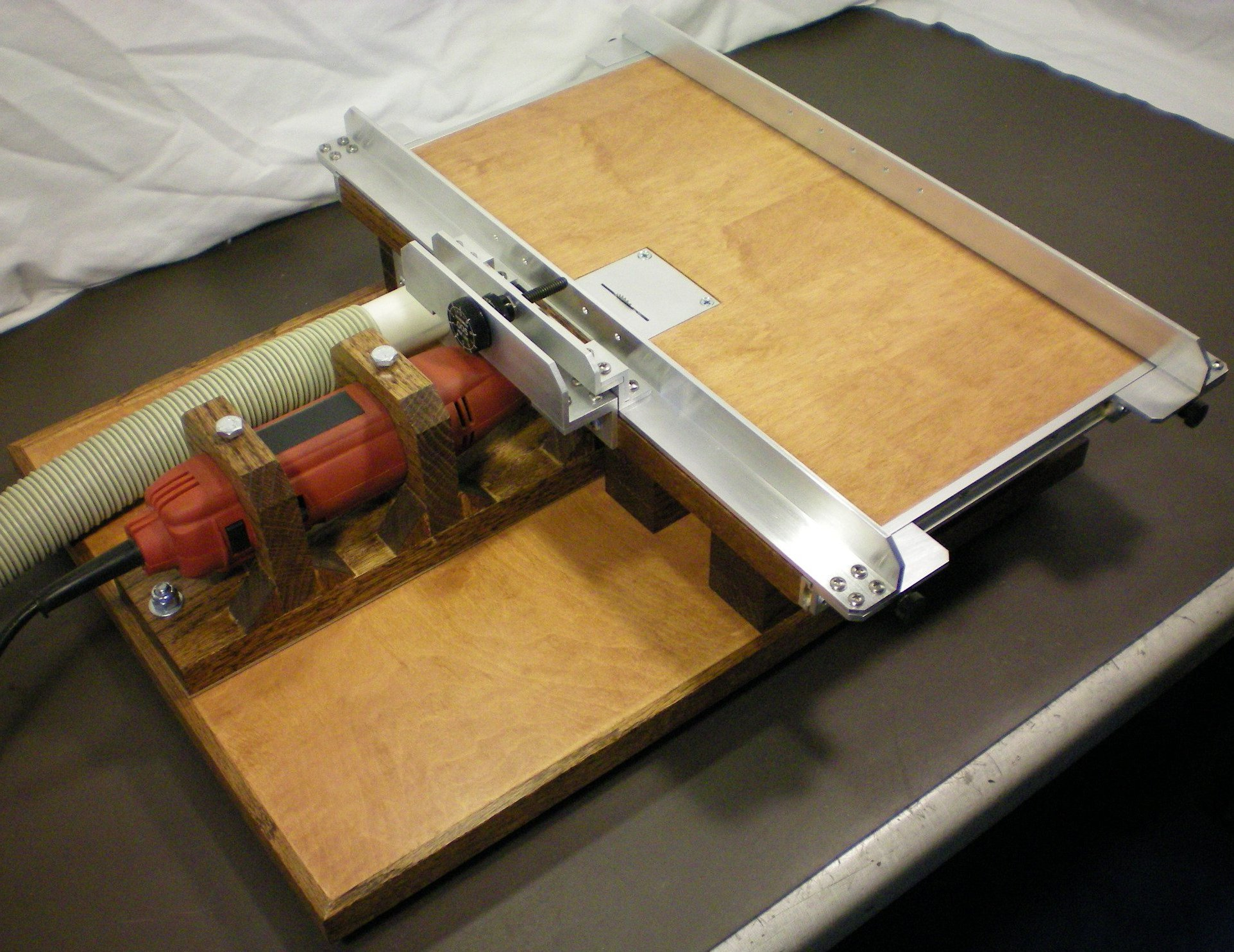
A 1-inch (25 mm) micro table saw.

Mini and micro table saws have a blade diameter of 4 inches (100 mm) and under. Mini table saws are typically 4 inch, while micro table saws are less than 4 inch, although the naming of the saws is not well defined.

Mini and micro table saws are generally used by hobbyists and model builders, although the mini table saws (4 inch) have gained some popularity with building contractors that need only a small saw to cut small pieces (such as wood trim). Being a fraction of the size (and weight) of a normal table saw, they are much easier to carry and transport.

Being much smaller than a normal table saw, they are substantially safer to use when cutting very small pieces. Using blades that have a smaller kerf (cutting width) than normal blades, there is less material lost and the possibility of kickback is reduced as well.

=== Sliding ===
A sliding table saw, also called a European cabinet saw or panel saw, is a variation on the traditional cabinet saw. They are generally used to cut large panels and sheet goods, such as plywood or medium-density fibreboard. Sliding table saws have a sliding table on the left side of the blade, usually attached to a folding arm mounted under the table, that is used for cross-cutting and ripping larger materials. Sliding table saws are the largest type of table saw, and are mostly used by large production cabinet shops. Most saws use 2.2-to-5.2-kilowatt (3–7 hp) three-phase induction motors. Sliding table saws usually incorporate a riving knife to prevent kickback from occurring.

Sliding saws sometimes offer a scoring blade, which is a second, smaller-diameter blade mounted in front of the regular saw blade. The scoring blade helps reduce splintering the lower face in certain types of stock, especially laminated stock. European models are sometimes available in multi-purpose tool configurations (combination machine) that offer jointer, planer, shaper (spindle moulder in Europe) or boring features. The blade arbor typically has a diameter of 30 mm, around twice that of a US saw. Many American woodworkers are likely to use a dado stack or wobble dado to cut dados (square sectioned grooves), while most European woodworkers would use a shaper or a router table for this task.

In recent years, European-style sliding table saws have had a small following in North America. They are usually either imported from European manufacturers such as Felder and its subsidiaries, Altendorf and Robland, Taiwanese companies such as Grizzly Industrial, or sold directly by U.S. based-companies such as Powermatic.

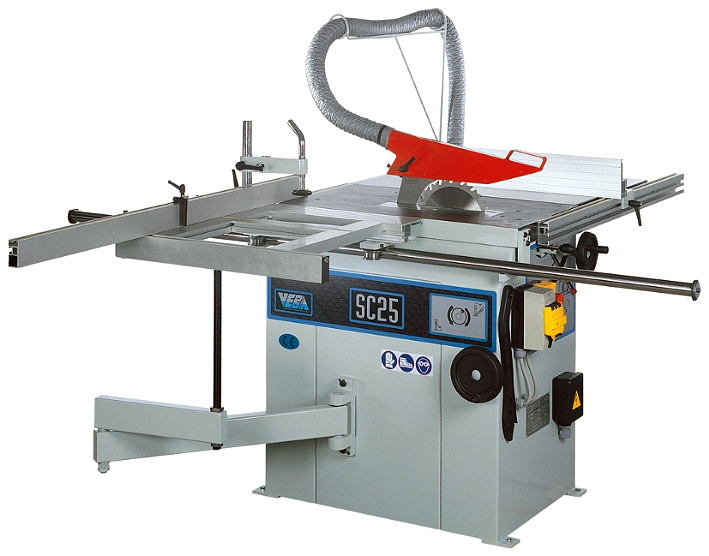
A European sliding table saw

== History ==
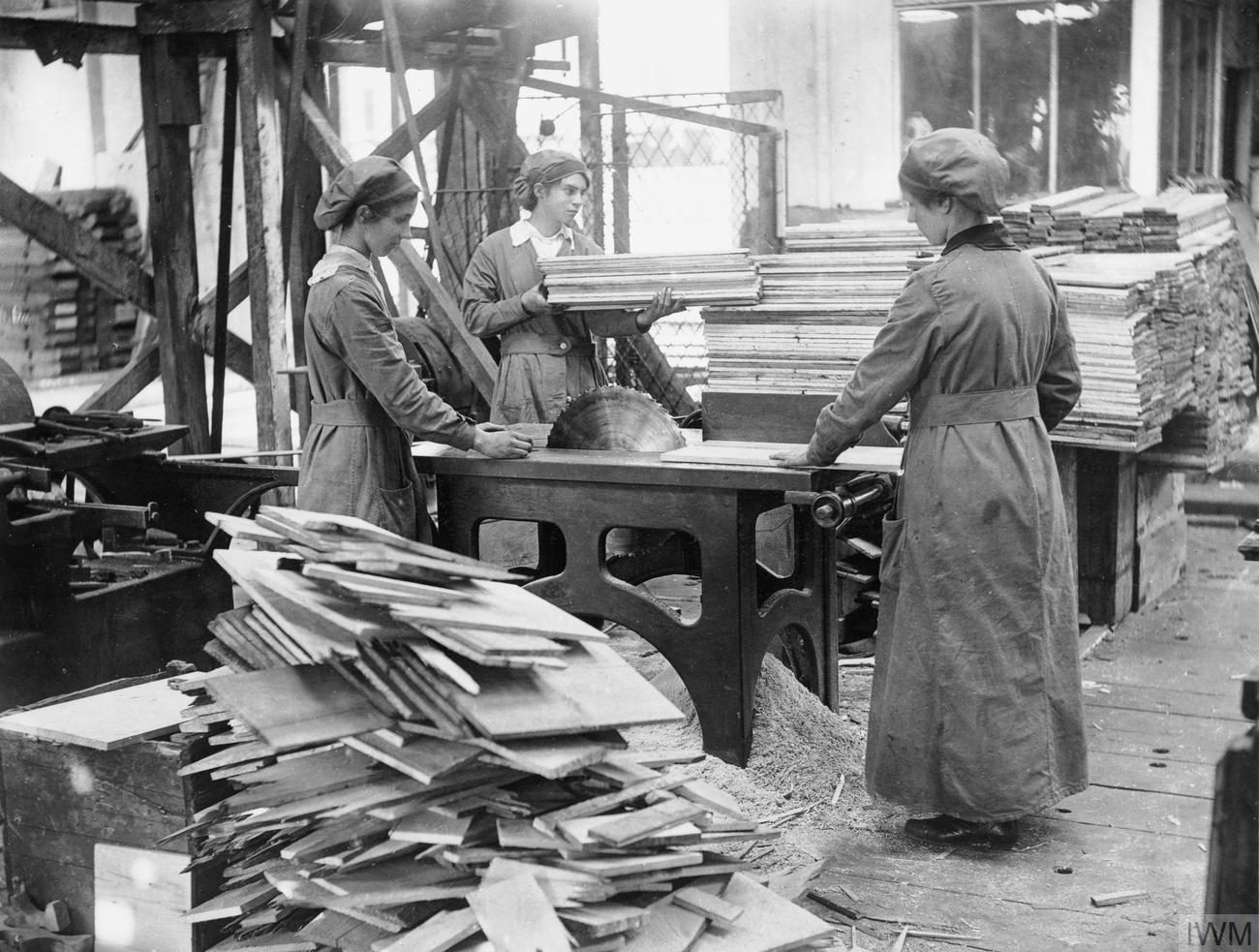
Three carpenters using a table saw during World War I

Table saws have been an integral part of woodworking for centuries, revolutionizing the way woodworkers manipulate wood to create intricate designs and structures. The table saw has had a profound impact on the field of woodworking by enabling woodworkers to achieve greater precision, efficiency, and versatility in their craft. With the ability to make a wide range of cuts, such as rip cuts, crosscuts, bevel cuts, and dado cuts, the table saw has become an indispensable tool in woodworking workshops worldwide.

The history of the table saw dates back to the early 18th century when the first known patent for a table saw was filed in 1777 by Samuel Miller who was an English scientist. Miller's design featured a circular saw blade mounted on an arbor with a table to support the wood being cut. This invention laid the foundation for the development of modern-day table saws.

Over the years, advancements in technology and design have led to the evolution of the table saw into various types, including benchtop, contractor, cabinet, and hybrid table saws etc. Each type offers different features and capabilities to meet the needs of woodworkers, from hobbyists to professionals.

A key figure in the development of the table saw is Wilhelm Altendorf, a German carpenter Altendorf revolutionized the design of table saws by introducing a sliding table that allowed woodworkers to make precise crosscuts and rip cuts with ease. This innovation set a new standard for accuracy and versatility in table saws.

Looking ahead, the future of the table saw will likely be influenced by new technology, like digital controls and sensors that can automate and improve cutting. Also, new blade designs and materials may make cutting even more precise and efficient.

== Safety ==
Table saws are especially dangerous tools because the operator holds the material being cut, instead of the saw, making it easy to accidentally move hands into the spinning blade. When using other types of circular saws, the material remains stationary, as the operator guides the saw into the material.

A push stick, riving knife, or protective cover over the spinning saw can reduce the chances of injury.

=== Kickback ===
Kickback is the term for when a piece of wood is ripped, and either pinches the blade, or turns outward against the blade of the spinning saw and is propelled back towards the operator at a high speed. The two main injuries that occur from kickback are caused by wood striking the head, chest, or torso of the operator, or the wood moving so quickly that the operator's hands stay on the wood and get pulled across the saw blade.

=== Dust extractor ===
A dust extractor should be fitted if sawdust is prone to build up under the cutting blade. Through friction the spinning blade will quickly ignite the accumulated dust, and the smoke can be mistaken for an overheated blade. The extractor also reduces the risk of a dust explosion and facilitates a healthier working environment.

=== Magnetic featherboard ===
The magnetic feather board was developed in 1990. The patented Grip-Tite is held to a cast iron table top or steel sub fence by high strength permanent magnets. The advantage of a magnetic feather board is the fast setup time on any cast iron tool deck or steel faced fence. When used in conjunction with a steel faced rip fence, they are used to hold down ripped wood on any saw deck and prevent kickback. Feed wheels added to the Grip-Tite base pull ripped wood to the fence, allowing the operator to rip wood on any table saw with no hands near the blade.

=== Miter slot featherboard ===
When a table saw has a table top made of a material other than cast iron, like aluminum, then a miter slot featherboard should be utilized to keep pressure on the stock against the fence when otherwise your hand would be in dangerous proximity to the saw blade. Keep in mind that this style feather board does take more time to set up than the magnetic style when deciding on a tool purchase. If a safety device is more convenient then it may be more frequently utilized. Never place a feather board past the leading edge of the blade or else kickback will occur.

== Safety precautions ==
Experts commonly recommend the following safety precautions:

- Read the instruction manual: Always read and understand a table saw's manual before use.
- Wear proper clothing: Avoid loose clothing, long sleeves and jewelry, and tie back long hair. Wear closed-toe shoes.
- Use personal protective equipment (PPE): Wear safety glasses and earmuffs or earplugs.
- Keep a tidy work area: Clear your work area of clutter and be sure there are no tripping hazards like power cords.
- Minimize distractions: Avoid distractions such as TVs or phones that can divert your attention from operating the saw safely.
- Disconnect power before blade changes: Unplug your table saw before changing blades to prevent accidental start-ups.
- Avoid wearing gloves: While it might feel safer, do not wear gloves while operating the table saw, as the teeth of the blade will hook onto the glove if they touch, resulting in the glove getting pulled along, causing massive hand injuries.

== Whistling sound ==
When operating, tables saws produce a whistling sound, which is caused by the space between teeth passing the saw’s throat insert. A blade with smaller teeth produces less sound. A pneumatic siren also works by rapidly interrupting air flow.

== Blade height ==
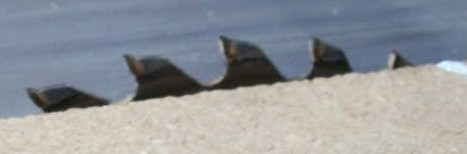
Ideally the blade of the table saw should extend higher than the board being cut by about 6 mm (1/4 in); this lessens the risk of kickback and other injuries and enables smooth cutting.

There are two competing schools of thought when it comes to properly setting the height of the blade for sawing. The first is commonly expressed thus: "Only allow the blade to rise above the work by the amount of finger you wish to lose." That is, the blade should protrude above the piece as little as possible, to prevent the loss of a finger in case of a sawing accident.

Another competing view is that the saw functions at its best when the angle of the blade teeth arc relative to the top surface of the workpiece is as extreme as possible. This facilitates chip ejection, shortens the overall distance through which the teeth act on the part, reduces power consumption and heat generation, substantially reduces the peak pushing force required, thus improving control, and causes the blade's force on the wood to act mostly downward rather than largely horizontally.

== Uses ==
Although the majority of table saws are used for cutting wood, table saws can also be used for cutting many materials, including hardwood, softwood, metal, and plastic. It is commonly used for ripping wood (cutting it to width), crosscutting (cutting it to length), kerfing (making small cuts to bend the wood), and cutting rabbets and grooves for joints. It can also make angled bevel cuts and other wood joints. This makes the table saw a versatile and essential tool in any woodworker's workshop.

== Accessories ==
- Outfeed tables: Table saws are often used to rip long boards or sheets of plywood or other sheet materials. The use of an out feed (or outfeed) table makes this process safer and easier. Many of these are shop built, while others are commercially available.
- Infeed tables: Used to assist feeding long boards or sheets of plywood. In the past roller stands were pretty much the only option, but there are now commercially available infeed units that are more efficient and easier to use.
- Downdraft tables: Used to draw harmful dust particles away from the user without obstructing the user's movement or productivity.
- Rip fence: Table saws commonly have a fence (guide) running from the front of the table (the side nearest the operator) to the back, parallel to the cutting plane of the blade. The distance of the fence from the blade can be adjusted, which determines where on the workpiece the cut is made. The fence is commonly called a "rip fence" referring to its use in guiding the workpiece during the process of making a rip cut. Most table saws come standard with a rip fence, but some high end saws are available without a fence so a fence of the user's choice can be purchased separately.
- Featherboard: Featherboards are used to keep wood against the rip fence. They can be a single spring, or many springs, as made from wood in many shops. They are held in place by high strength magnets, clamps, or expansion bars in the miter slot.
- Hold down: The circular sawblade of a tablesaw will pick up a piece of wood if not held down. Hold downs can be a vertical version of featherboards, attached to a fence with magnets or clamps. Another type of hold down uses wheels on a spring-loaded mechanism to push down on a workpiece as it is guided past the blade.
- Sub fence: A piece of wood clamped to the rip fence allows a dado set to cut into the rip fence, allowing rabbet cuts with a dado blade.
- Miter gauge: The table has one or two slots (grooves) running from front to back, also parallel to the cutting plane of the blade. These miter slots (or miter grooves) are used to position and guide either a miter gauge (also known as a crosscut fence) or crosscut sled. The miter gauge is usually set to be at 90 degrees to the plane of the blade's cut, to cause the cut made in the workpiece to be made at a right angle. The miter gauge can also be adjusted to cause the cut to be made at a precisely controlled angle (a so-called miter cut).
- Crosscut sled: A crosscut sled is generally used to hold the workpiece at a fixed 90-degree angle to the blade, allowing precise repeatable cuts at the most commonly used angle. The sled is normally guided by a runner fastened under it that slides in a miter slot. This device is normally shop made, but can be purchased.
- Tenon jig: A tenon jig is a device that holds the workpiece vertically so cuts can be made across the end. This allows tenons to be formed. Often this is a purchased item, but it can be shop made. The tenon jig is guided by a miter slot or a fence.
- Stacked dado: Saws made for the US market are generally capable of using a stacked dado blade set. This is a kit with two outer blades and a number of inner chip breakers that can be used to cut dados (grooves in the workpiece) of any width up to the maximum (generally 13/16 in [21 mm]). Stacked dado sets are available in diameters of 6, 8 and 10 inches (150, 200 and 250 mm). 8- and 10-inch stacked dado sets are not recommended for saws with 1 1/2 horsepower (1.1 kW) or less. Although 10-inch stacked dado sets are available with a 5/8-inch (16 mm) bore, these are recommended with a 1-inch (25 mm) bore.
- Inserts: Table saws have a changeable insert in the table through which the blade projects. Purchasable inserts are usually made out of metal. Zero-clearance inserts can be made of a sawable material such as plastic or wood. When a zero-clearance insert is initially inserted, the blade is raised through the insert creating the slot. This creates a slot with no gaps around the blade. The zero clearance insert helps prevent tearout by providing support for wood fibers right next to the blade thus helping to make a very clean cut. Other inserts can be bought or created in the same manner, such as a dado insert.
- Splitter: A splitter or riving knife is a vertical projection located behind the saw blade. This can be a pin or a fin. It is slightly narrower in width than the blade and located directly in line with the blade. The splitter prevents the material being cut from being rotated thereby helping to prevent kickback. Splitters may incorporate pawls, a mechanism with teeth designed to bite into wood and preventing kickback. Splitters can take many forms, including being part of the blade guard that comes standard with the saw. Another type of splitter is simply a vertical pin or fin attached to an insert. Splitters are available commercially or can be made from wood, metal or plastic.
- Anti-kickback pawls: Most modern US table saws are fitted with kickback pawls, a set of small spring-loaded metal teeth on a free-swinging pawl (usually attached to the guard) which help to put a strong downward force on a board. This can help to immobilize the board in the event of a kickback. However, these have sometimes been found to be somewhat ineffective when compared to a splitter.
- Push stick: A handheld safety device used to safely maneuver a workpiece, keeping it flat against the machine table and fence while it is being cut.
