= Dado (joinery) =

Type of slot for joining pieces of wood

A through dado (left) and a stopped dado

A dado (US and Canada, /ˈdeɪdoʊ/), housing (UK) or trench (Europe) is a slot or trench cut into the surface of a piece of machinable material, usually wood. When viewed in cross-section, a dado has three sides. A dado is cut across, or perpendicular to, the grain and is thus differentiated from a groove which is cut with, or parallel to the grain. Dados are often used to affix shelves to cabinetry bodies. Similar to the dado, see rabbet (rebate).

== Variations ==
- A through dado involves cuts which run between both edges of the surface, leaving both ends open.
- A stopped or blind dado ends before one (stopped) or both (blind) of the cuts meets the edge of the surface.
- A half dado is formed with a narrow dado cut into one part, coupled with a rabbet of another piece. This joint tends to be used because of its ability to hide unattractive gaps due to varying material thicknesses.

== See also ==
- Dado set
- Woodworking joints
