= List of How It's Made episodes =

How It's Made is a documentary television series that premiered on January 6, 2001, on the Discovery Channel in Canada and Science in the United States. The program is produced in the Canadian province of Quebec by Productions MAJ, Inc. and Productions MAJ 2. In the United Kingdom, it is broadcast on Discovery Channel, Quest, and DMAX.

== Episodes ==
=== Season 1 (2001) ===
Series Ep.	Episode	Segment A	Segment B	Segment C	Segment D	Air dates
1-01	1	Aluminum foil	Snowboards	Contact lenses	Bread	January 6, 2001
1-02	2	Compact discs	Mozzarella cheese	Tights	Fluorescent tubes	January 13, 2001
1-03	3	Toothpicks	Acrylic bathtubs	Helicopters	Beer	January 20, 2001
1-04	4	Hearing aids	3D puzzles	Rubber mats	Toilets	January 27, 2001
1-05	5	Copy paper	Jeans	Computers	Plate glass	February 3, 2001
1-06	6	Nails and staples	Safety glasses	Fabrics	Bicycles	February 10, 2001
1-07	7	Kayaks	Safety boots	Electronic signs	Cereal and granola bars	February 17, 2001
1-08	8	Trucks	Adhesive bandages	Computer circuit boards	Liquor	February 24, 2001
1-09	9	Steel	Apple juice	Aircraft landing gear	Cosmetics	March 3, 2001
1-10	10	Holograms	Package printing	Skin culture	Canned corn	March 10, 2001
1-11	11	Plastic bags	Solar panels	Plastic fuel containers	Hockey sticks	March 17, 2001
1-12	12	Aluminum screw caps	Chocolate	Pills	Pasta	March 24, 2001
1-13	13	Bicycle helmets	Aluminum	Automotive brakes	Lithium-ion batteries	March 31, 2001

=== Season 2 (2002) ===
Series Ep.	Episode	Segment A	Segment B	Segment C	Segment D	Air dates
2-01	14	Eyeglass lenses	Granite	Potato chips	Computer microprocessors	September 14, 2002
2-02	15	Honey	Fiber optics	Bricks	Pipe organs	September 21, 2002
2-03	16	Personal watercraft	Wine	Particle board office furniture	Ice skates	September 28, 2002
2-04	17	Winter jackets	Animation	Mushrooms	Gold rings	October 5, 2002
2-05	18	Hydroponic lettuce	Construction wood	Recycling	Fishing flies	October 12, 2002
2-06	19	Diamond cutting	Wooden doors	Paintballs	Newspapers	October 19, 2002
2-07	20	Carpets	Drinking water	Laser eye surgery	Acoustic guitars	October 26, 2002
2-08	21	Fibreglass boats	Clothes dryers	Bubble gum	Fireworks	November 2, 2002
2-09	22	Safes	False teeth	Airplanes	Maple syrup	November 9, 2002
2-10	23	Gummies	Aluminum cans	Fish farming	Bronze sculptures	November 16, 2002
2-11	24	Aluminum pots and pans	Artificial limbs	Peanut butter	High-intensity light bulbs	November 23, 2002
2-12	25	Cars	Grocery carts	Rapid tooling and prototyping	Collectible coins	November 30, 2002
2-13	26	Ball bearings	Electrical wires	Lost-wax casting	Automated machines	December 7, 2002

=== Season 3 (2003) ===
Series Ep.	Episode	Segment A	Segment B	Segment C	Segment D	Air Dates
3-01	27	Pre-inked stamps	Cranberries	Cotton yarn	Road signs	October 7, 2003
3-02	28	Combination padlocks	Pottery	Recreational vehicles	Erasers	October 14, 2003
3-03	29	Wheel loaders	Vegetable oil	Hand tools	Cotton swabs and cosmetic pads	October 21, 2003
3-04	30	Temporary metal fences	Asphalt shingles	Expanded polystyrene products	Hard candies	October 28, 2003
3-05	31	Horse-drawn carriages	Artificial eyes	Dog and cat food	Mirrors	November 4, 2003
3-06	32	Yogurt	Candles	Neon signs	Bookbindings	November 11, 2003
3-07	33	Prepared mustard	Violins	Nuts and bolts	Toilet paper	November 18, 2003
3-08	34	Fresh cut flowers	Adhesive tape	Tofu	Lottery tickets	November 25, 2003
3-09	35	Inflatable watercraft	Couscous	Modelling dough	Wicker products	December 2, 2003
3-10	36	Wind generators	PVC gloves	Thermoformed glass	Fire trucks	December 9, 2003
3-11	37	Car radiators	Hatchery chicks	Phyllo dough	Cross-country skis	December 16, 2003
3-12	38	Electric baseboard heaters	Moulded pulp containers	Prepared chicken	Video games (Note: The game being made is Prince of Persia: The Sands of Time.)	December 23, 2003
3-13	39	Firefighter boots	Garden tools	Automated machines (Note: A compilation of clips of automated machines being in use from previous segments.)	Gypsum board	December 30, 2003

=== Season 4 (2004) ===
Series Ep.	Episode	Segment A	Segment B	Segment C	Segment D	Air Dates
4-01	40	Plastic bottles and jars	Mail	Eggs	Handcrafted wooden pens	January 4, 2004
4-02	41	Plastic injection molds	Automotive oil filters	Filing cabinets	Blown glass	January 11, 2004
4-03	42	High-precision cutting tools	Stained glass	Semi-trailers	Recorders	January 18, 2004
4-04	43	Conga drums	Metal plating	Buttons		January 25, 2004
4-05	44	Grinding wheels	Compost	Window blinds	Milk	February 1, 2004
4-06	45	Brushes and push brooms	Blackboards	Smoked salmon	Zippers	February 8, 2004
4-07	46	3D commercial signs	Hardwood floors	Corrugated polyethylene pipe	Mattresses	February 15, 2004
4-08	47	Ceramic tiles	Nuts	Steel forgings	Skateboards	February 22, 2004
4-09	48	Car engines	Flour	Recliners	Envelopes	February 29, 2004
4-10	49	Plastic cups and cutlery	Special effects makeup	Gold	Harps	March 7, 2004
4-11	50	Laminate	Frozen treats	Children's building blocks	Detergents	March 14, 2004
4-12	51	Decorative mouldings	Commercial pulleys	Industrial rubber hose	Sheet vinyl flooring	March 21, 2004
4-13	52	Putty knives	Garage doors	Electric motors	Wool	March 28, 2004

=== Season 5 (2005) ===
Series Ep.	Episode	Segment A	Segment B	Segment C	Segment D	Air Dates
5-01	53	Paving asphalt	Marshmallow cookies	Loudspeakers	Electronic door locks	September 7, 2005
5-02	54	Wood-burning stoves	Orthoses	Ballet slippers	Buses	September 14, 2005
5-03	55	Robotic arms	Tattoos	Sanitary napkins	Concrete pipes	September 20, 2005
5-04	56	Hockey gloves	Snack cakes	Remoulded tires	Wastewater treatment	September 28, 2005
5-05	57	Ambulances	Dining room tables	Diatonic accordions	Acrylic awards	October 5, 2005
5-06	58	Alkaline batteries	Wheelchairs	Flutes	Cowboy boots	October 11, 2005
5-07	59	Golf balls	Furniture handles	Parking meters	Room dividers	October 18, 2005
5-08	60	Suits of armour	Street light poles	Bent hardwood	Membrane switches	October 26, 2005
5-09	61	Sulkies	Bagpipes	Yule logs	Fishing lures	November 2, 2005
5-10	62	Goalie pads	Lapel pins	Cardboard boxes	Crystal wine glasses	November 9, 2005
5-11	63	Cement	Caskets	Soft drinks	Glider rockers	November 15, 2005
5-12	64	Kitchen knives	Mannequins	Socks	Hypodermic needles	November 22, 2005
5-13	65	Electrical panels	Kites	Eyeglass frames	Toothbrushes	November 29, 2005

=== Season 6 (2006) ===
Series Ep.	Episode	Segment A	Segment B	Segment C	Segment D	Air Dates
6-01	66	Three-wheeled vehicles	Baseball bats	Artificial bonsai	Trombones	January 4, 2006
6-02	67	Springs	Pavers	Pianos	Rotary cannons	January 11, 2006
6-03	68	Rope	Billiard tables	Sailboards	Cymbals	January 18, 2006
6-04	69	Seatbelts	Windows	Wax figurines	Hot air balloons	January 25, 2006
6-05	70	Air filters	Billiard cues	Ice sculptures	Suits	February 1, 2006
6-06	71	Escalator handrails	Highlighters	Guitar strings	Wigs	February 8, 2006
6-07	72	Traditional bows	Coffee machines	Mascots	Hammocks	February 15, 2006
6-08	73	Fibreglass insulation	Wooden ducks	Gumball machines	Exhaust systems	February 22, 2006
6-09	74	Chains	Bagels	Vinyl records		March 1, 2006
6-10	75	Windshields	English saddles	Butter	Post clocks	March 8, 2006
6-11	76	Individual transporters	Cedar canoes	Electric guitars		March 15, 2006
6-12	77	Residential water heaters	Airbags	Jelly beans	Ice resurfacers	March 22, 2006
6-13	78	Amphibious vehicles	Putters	Model ships	Drumheads	March 29, 2006

=== Season 7 (2006) ===
Series Ep.	Episode	Segment A	Segment B	Segment C	Segment D	Air Dates
7-01	79	Footballs	Electric guitar amplifiers	Marbles	Airplane propellers	September 5, 2006
7-02	80	Engine blocks	Jawbreakers	Drum shells	Drums	September 12, 2006
7-03	81	Lighters	Fossil preparation	Hockey pucks	High-pressure cylinders	September 19, 2006
7-04	82	Balloons	Wallpaper	Frozen French fries	Incandescent light bulbs	September 26, 2006
7-05	83	Matches	Carousel horses	Fine porcelain	Automotive fuel tanks	October 3, 2006
7-06	84	Glass cookware	Soap bars	Steel drums	Firefighter uniforms	October 10, 2006
7-07	85	Crayons	Wooden kayaks	Lawn mowers	Gold chains	October 17, 2006
7-08	86	Inflatable safety devices	Braille typewriters	Carbon-fibre cellos		October 24, 2006
7-09	87	Carbon-fibre masts	Fortune cookies	IMAX projectors	Roller chains	October 31, 2006
7-10	88	Firefighter helmets	Nautical compasses	Packaging tubes	Hand saws	November 7, 2006
7-11	89	Halogen bulbs	Cellulose insulation	Aluminum ladders	Bamboo fly rods	November 14, 2006
7-12	90	Drill bits	Photo booths	Stamps		November 21, 2006
7-13	91	Yacht wheels	Braided rugs	Automotive thermostats	Chisels	November 28, 2006

=== Season 8 (2007) ===
Series Ep.	Episode	Segment A	Segment B	Segment C	Segment D	Air Dates
8-01	92	Photographs	Fur tanning	Welding electrodes	Electric violins	January 2, 2007
8-02	93	Glass bottles	Hacksaws	Ice Hockey Goalie Masks		January 9, 2007
8-03	94	Lacrosse sticks	Frozen fish products	Flashlights	Paintbrushes	January 16, 2007
8-04	95	Deep-cycle batteries	Tins	Optical lenses		January 23, 2007
8-05	96	Horseshoes	Dishwashers	Graphite fly rods	Frozen pizzas	January 30, 2007
8-06	97	Pistons	Paint rollers	Parachutes	Chimneys	February 6, 2007
8-07	98	CO₂ cartridges	Pretzels	Scissor lifts	Skating rinks	February 20, 2007
8-08	99	Pro hockey sticks	Bronzed baby shoes	Treadmills	Handheld computers	February 27, 2007
8-09	100	Motorcycles	Clay pipes	Drumsticks	Whistles	March 6, 2007
8-10	101	Handcuffs	Caulking and joint compound	Propane tanks	Forensic facial reconstruction	March 13, 2007
8-11	102	Fur coats	Hearses	Outdoor lighting fixtures	Golf tees	March 20, 2007
8-12	103	Fishing reels	Miniature houses	Kitchen mixers		March 27, 2007
8-13	104	Manhole covers	Range hoods	Artificial logs	Snowmobiles	April 3, 2007

=== Season 9 (2008) ===
Series Ep.	Episode	Segment A	Segment B	Segment C	Segment D	Air Dates
9-01	105	Solid tires	Cheesecake	Canoe paddles	Globes	January 13, 2008
9-02	106	Boomerangs	Barbecues	Pinball machines	Strobe lights	January 20, 2008
9-03	107	Wooden bowls	Chainsaws	Stackable potato chips	Jet compressor blades	January 27, 2008
9-04	108	Steel wool	Ranges	Carved candles	Slot machines	February 3, 2008
9-05	109	CCD semiconductors	Airline meals	Paper cups	Trumpets	February 10, 2008
9-06	110	Padlocks	Hair clippers	Wooden shoes	Synthetic leather	February 17, 2008
9-07	111	Racing shells	Stainless steel sinks	Leather	Pedal steel guitars	February 24, 2008
9-08	112	Swords	Pontoons	Grandfather clocks	Fuses	March 2, 2008
9-09	113	Bumpers	Lighting gels and camera filters	Steam-powered models	Candy canes	March 9, 2008
9-10	114	Umbrellas	Outboard motors	Silver cutlery	Tape measures	March 16, 2008
9-11	115	Scalpels	Oil paints	British police helmets	Ice axes	March 23, 2008
9-12	116	Bacon	Snow blowers	Luxury cars		March 30, 2008
9-13	117	Automatic transmissions	Silver miniatures	Hot air balloon baskets	Darts	April 6, 2008

=== Season 10 (2008) ===
Series Ep.	Episode	Segment A	Segment B	Segment C	Segment D	Air Dates
10-01	118	Magnets	Cooked ham	Silver-plated teapots	Crash test dummies	June 11, 2008
10-02	119	Curling stones	Refrigerators	Aluminum baseball bats	Opalescent glass	June 18, 2008
10-03	120	Levels	Hot dogs	Abrasive grains	Sandpaper	June 25, 2008
10-04	121	Ice cream treats	Wooden golf clubs	Aircraft wings	Car battery recycling	July 2, 2008
10-05	122	Automotive fuel pumps	Cricket bats	Change machines	Ductile iron pipes	July 9, 2008
10-06	123	Wooden barrels	Fire hydrants	Automotive seats	Cathode ray tubes	July 16, 2008
10-07	124	Stainless steel	Football helmets	Resin figurines	Laboratory glassware	July 23, 2008
10-08	125	Fire extinguishers	Doughnuts	Shock absorbers	Banjos	July 30, 2008
10-09	126	Dress forms	Boat propellers	Duvets	Faucets	August 6, 2008
10-10	127	Bronze bells	Wooden airplane propellers	Charcoal briquettes	Gas log fireplaces	August 13, 2008
10-11	128	Ice cream cones	Tent trailers	Shoe polish	Pliers	August 20, 2008
10-12	129	Steel shipping drums	Police whistles	Miniature train cars	Glass blocks	August 27, 2008
10-13	130	Pocket knives	Soapstone products	Electric pole transformers	Traditional snowshoes	September 3, 2008

=== Season 11 (2008) ===
Series Ep.	Episode	Segment A	Segment B	Segment C	Segment D	Air Dates
11-01	131	Binoculars	Sparklers	Rubber boots	Circular saw blades	September 10, 2008
11-02	132	Anatomical models	Jukeboxes	Tortilla chips	Spark plugs	September 17, 2008
11-03	133	Pencils	Metal recycling	Coffee		September 24, 2008
11-04	134	Javelins	Cuckoo clocks	Hearts of palm	Windshield wipers	October 1, 2008
11-05	135	Technical glass	Washing machines	Playing cards	Crossbows	October 8, 2008
11-06	136	Cine cameras	Glass Christmas ornaments	Giant tires		October 15, 2008
11-07	137	Microphones	Hot tubs	Artificial turf	Beer steins	October 22, 2008
11-08	138	Hot rods	Decorative eggs	Fire hose nozzles	Baseballs	October 29, 2008
11-09	139	Accordions	Pineapples	Artificial joints		November 5, 2008
11-10	140	Giant valves	Sardines	Barographs	Disposable diapers	November 12, 2008
11-11	141	Heated skate blades	Gliders	Hand bells	Fire hoses	November 19, 2008
11-12	142	Induction cooktops	Truck scales	Tetra Pak containers	Harmonicas	November 26, 2008
11-13	143	Baseball gloves	Medical electrodes	Stetson hats		December 3, 2008

=== Season 12 (2009) ===
Series Ep.	Episode	Segment A	Segment B	Segment C	Segment D	Air Dates
12-01	144	Pneumatic impact wrenches	Cultured marble sinks	Plantain chips	NASCAR stock cars	January 7, 2009
12-02	145	Jaws of life	Artificial Christmas trees	Soda crackers	Ratchets	January 14, 2009
12-03	146	Thermometers	Produce scales	Aircraft painting	Luxury chocolates	January 21, 2009
12-04	147	Carburetors	Air conditioners	Sugar		January 28, 2009
12-05	148	Combination wrenches	Deli meats	Golf cars	Airships	February 4, 2009
12-06	149	Carbon fibre car parts	Hand dryers	Recycled polyester yarn	Fleece	February 11, 2009
12-07	150	Police badges	Muffins	Car washes	Pressure gauges	February 18, 2009
12-08	151	Metal detectors	Rum	Tiffany reproductions	Aircraft engines	February 25, 2009
12-09	152	Riding mowers	Popcorn	Adjustable beds	Cultured diamonds	March 4, 2009
12-10	153	Airstream trailers	Horseradish	Industrial steam boilers	Deodorant	March 11, 2009
12-11	154	Screwdrivers	Compact track loaders	Physician scales	Carbon fibre bats	March 18, 2009
12-12	155	Escalators	Kevlar canoes	Goat cheese	Disc music boxes	March 25, 2009
12-13	156	Motorcycle engines	Glass enamel sculptures	Hand-made paper	Vaulting poles	April 1, 2009

=== Season 13 (2009) ===
Series Ep.	Episode	Segment A	Segment B	Segment C	Segment D	Air Dates
13-01	157	Hammers	Swiss cheese	Roller skates	Coloured pencils	April 24, 2009
13-02	158	Carbon fiber bicycles	Blood products	Forged chandeliers	Ballpoint pens	May 1, 2009
13-03	159	Swiss army knives	Player piano rolls	Oil tankers	Racing wheels	May 8, 2009
13-04	160	Bowling balls	Barber poles	Felt	Radar guns	May 15, 2009
13-05	161	Copper pipe fittings	Cylinder music boxes	Pepper mills	Hot rod steering columns	May 22, 2009
13-06	162	Gears	Leather Watchbands	Vitrelle dishes	Kitchen shears	May 29, 2009
13-07	163	Pressure cookers	Mechanical singing birds	Oceanographic buoys	Stainless steel tank trailers	June 5, 2009
13-08	164	Aluminium boats	Alpine horns	Luxury watches		June 12, 2009
13-09	165	All-terrain vehicles	Alpine skis	Laser cutters	Marble sculptures	June 19, 2009
13-10	166	Socket sets	Leather shoes	Aluminium water bottles	Bike chains	June 26, 2009
13-11	167	Carved wood sculptures	Flatware	Cow bells	Fountain pens	July 3, 2009
13-12	168	Olive oil	Lift trucks	Seamless rolled rings	Ski boots	July 10, 2009
13-13	169	Professional cookware	Luxury inlaid boxes	High-efficiency water heaters	Scooters	July 17, 2009

=== Season 14 (2009–2010) ===
Series Ep.	Episode	Segment A	Segment B	Segment C	Segment D	Air Dates
14-01	170	Ski goggles	Tower cranes	Porcelain figurines	Diesel engines	October 16, 2009
14-02	171	Mini GP motorcycles	Fig cookies	Tool boxes	Pipe bends	October 23, 2009
14-03	172	Western revolver replicas	Arc trainers	Used-oil furnaces	Vegetable peelers and pizza cutters	October 30, 2009
14-04	173	Metal golf clubs	Waffles	Custom wires and cables	Train wheels	November 6, 2009
14-05	174	Sails	Walnuts	Wheel immobilizers	Honeycomb structural panels	November 13, 2009
14-06	175	Surfboards	Stickers	Sandwich cookies	Concrete roofing tiles	November 20, 2009
14-07	176	Stuffed olives	Astrolabes	Western saddles		November 27, 2009
14-08	177	Custom running shoes	Axes	Racing karts	Animatronics	December 4, 2009
14-09	178	Headphones	Diving regulators	Reflector light bulbs		December 11, 2009
14-10	179	Fly fishing reels	House paint	Weaving looms	Ice makers	December 18, 2009
14-11	180	Graphite pencil leads	Clarinets	Special effects		December 25, 2009
14-12	181	Airboats	Onions	3D metal printing	Curved cabinet doors	January 1, 2010
14-13	182	Retractable ballpoint pens	Solar salt	Tubas		January 8, 2010

=== Season 15 (2010) ===
Series Ep.	Episode	Segment A	Segment B	Segment C	Segment D	Air Dates
15-01	183	Kelp caviar	Luxury sailboats	Dental crowns	High-performance engines	March 26, 2010
15-02	184	Leather briefcases	Crop dusters	Corn whiskey	Drag racing clutches	April 2, 2010
15-03	185	Train rails	Desalinated water	Racing wheelchairs	Parquetry	April 9, 2010
15-04	186	Flight simulators	Traditional bookbinding	Greenhouse tomatoes	Hurricane-proof shutters	April 16, 2010
15-05	187	Worcestershire sauce	Lawn bowls	Radio-controlled model jets		April 23, 2010
15-06	188	Pipes	Rock climbing gear	Leather bike saddles	Luxury sports cars	April 30, 2010
15-07	189	Replica foods	Traffic cone dispensers	Rocking horses	London taxis	May 7, 2010
15-08	190	Miniature furniture	Garden steam locomotives	Hovercraft	Folding bicycles	May 14, 2010
15-09	191	Crosscut saws	Haggis	Collectible firearms		May 21, 2010
15-10	192	Alligator bags	Lockers	Bench planes	Deployable flight recorders	May 28, 2010
15-11	193	Grapples	Flavourings	Dog sleds	Athletic shoes	June 4, 2010
15-12	194	Retractile cords	Wood frame sports cars	Sushi		June 11, 2010
15-13	195	Leather wallets	French horns	Soy sauce	Children's ride-on cars	June 18, 2010

=== Season 16 (2010) ===
Series Ep.	Episode	Segment A	Segment B	Segment C	Segment D	Air Dates
16-01	196	Millefiori glass paperweights	Road salt	Nutcrackers	Car doors	October 1, 2010
16-02	197	Straight razors	Black pudding	Steering wheels	Inorganic pigments	October 8, 2010
16-03	198	Cast-iron cookware	Biodiesel	Clothes hangers	Stone wool insulation	October 15, 2010
16-04	199	Needles and pins	Architectural mouldings	Locomotives	Clothespins	October 22, 2010
16-05	200	Filigree glass	Fish food	Motorhomes		October 29, 2010
16-06	201	Surgical instruments	Ketchup	Double-decker buses	Walking sticks	November 5, 2010
16-07	202	Audio vacuum tubes	Light bars	Wood model aircraft	Metal snare drums	November 12, 2010
16-08	203	Kitchen accessories	Central vacuums	Papier-mâché animals	Hydraulic cylinders	November 19, 2010
16-09	204	Clay liquor jugs	Poultry deli meats	NASCAR engines		November 26, 2010
16-10	205	Digital dentistry	Nail clippers	Poster restoration	Canola oil	December 3, 2010
16-11	206	Dial thermometers	Hummus	Spent fuel containers	Straw sombreros	December 10, 2010
16-12	207	Tequila	Waterbeds	Flip-flops	Silver	December 17, 2010
16-13	208	Composite propane cylinders	Salsa	Water-pumping windmills	Dragsters	December 24, 2010

=== Season 17 (2011) ===
Series Ep.	Episode	Segment A	Segment B	Segment C	Segment D	Air Dates
17-01	209	Decorative sombreros	Salad dressings and marinades	Cap guns	Regenerative medicine	April 1, 2011
17-02	210	Cheese graters	Hot sauce	Silver jewellery	Traditional Mexican chairs	April 8, 2011
17-03	211	Game calls	Mayonnaise	Traditional razor blades	Butterfly safety razors	April 15, 2011
17-04	212	Corn tortillas	Crankshafts and camshafts	Bush planes	Aluminium bike wheels	April 22, 2011
17-05	213	Folding kayaks	Piñatas	Garbage trucks	Ceramic composite brake discs	April 29, 2011
17-06	214	Rolled wafers	Wood pellets	Class and championship rings		May 6, 2011
17-07	215	Speed skates	Synthetic rubber	Cocoa beans	Bulk chocolate	May 13, 2011
17-08	216	Custom steering wheels	Aerospace fuel lines	Apple pies	Household radiators	May 20, 2011
17-09	217	Whips	Automatic pizza makers	Incense cones	Model jet engines	May 27, 2011
17-10	218	Heather gems	Instant film	Beet sugar	Electric roadsters	June 3, 2011
17-11	219	Underwater robots	Lasagne	Bandsaws	Ski and trekking poles	June 10, 2011
17-12	220	Laminated wood beams	Sport utility vehicles	Veggie burgers	Wood boring augers	June 17, 2011
17-13	221	Turbochargers	Enchiladas	Watches		June 24, 2011

=== Season 18 (2011) ===
Series Ep.	Episode	Segment A	Segment B	Segment C	Segment D	Air Dates
18-01	222	Patterned glass panels	Road cases	Stop-frame animation		September 14, 2011
18-02	223	Industrial wire ropes	Living walls	Large format cameras	Gemstones	September 21, 2011
18-03	224	Chocolate coins	Floor heating systems	Pedal cars	Latex swords	September 28, 2011
18-04	225	Farmed caviar	Intake manifolds	Motorcycle jackets	Shovels and spades	October 5, 2011
18-05	226	Wax figures	Awnings	Sandwich crackers	Pewter tankards	October 12, 2011
18-06	227	Pipe cleaners	Blue Stilton cheese	Smart electric meters	Telescopes	October 19, 2011
18-07	228	Fish replicas	Siren systems	Pre-packaged sandwiches	Candlesticks	October 26, 2011
18-08	229	Tapioca pudding	Snow ploughs	Paddle boats	Fibre cement siding	November 2, 2011
18-09	230	Rally cars	Pork pies	Floating fountains	Artificial stone ornaments	November 9, 2011
18-10	231	Cufflinks	Blueberry turnovers	Dashboards	Earthenware pottery	November 16, 2011
18-11	232	Pharmaceutical blister packs	Deli slicers	Oysters	Weather vanes	November 23, 2011
18-12	233	Top and bowler hats	Solar water heaters	Sticky buns	Electrostatic speakers	November 30, 2011
18-13	234	Turntables	Steam engines	Playground equipment	Non-stick cookware	December 7, 2011

=== Season 19 (2012) ===
Series Ep.	Episode	Segment A	Segment B	Segment C	Segment D	Air Dates
19-01	235	Garden forks	English toffee	Paint chip cards	Bundt pans	April 19, 2012
19-02	236	Pewter flasks	Potato salad	Hydrogen fuel cells	Engineered wood siding	April 26, 2012
19-03	237	Canvas wall tents	Peace pipes	Shredded wheat cereal	Cannons	May 3, 2012
19-04	238	Robotic hunting decoys	Canned tomatoes	Scoreboards	Lassos	May 10, 2012
19-05	239	Turf grass	Beef jerky	Wood chippers	Bowling pins	May 17, 2012
19-06	240	Multi-tools	Jojoba oil	Marionettes		May 24, 2012
19-07	241	Fish decoys	Film digitization	Cylinder stoves	Concrete light poles	May 31, 2012
19-08	242	Bamboo bicycles	Chainsaw art	Breath mints	Manual motorcycle transmissions	June 7, 2012
19-09	243	Dinnerware	Air brake tanks	Frosted cereal	Fossils	June 14, 2012
19-10	244	Clay	Pitted prunes	Spurs	Polyurethane tires	June 21, 2012
19-11	245	Tasers	Canned soup	Jaw harps and mouth bows	Diving boards	June 28, 2012
19-12	246	Navajo rugs	Crude oil	Kaleidoscopes	Titanium dental implants	July 5, 2012
19-13	247	Space pens	Reef aquariums	Metal caskets	Composite bicycle wheels	July 12, 2012

=== Season 20 (2012–2013) ===
Series Ep.	Episode	Segment A	Segment B	Segment C	Segment D	Air Dates
20-01	248	Native healing drums	Raisins	Stereoscopic viewers	Ribbon microphones	November 1, 2012
20-02	249	Horse bits	Oat cereal	Turquoise jewellery	Electric scooters	November 8, 2012
20-03	250	Nail nippers	Jade putters	Ice cider	Water skis	November 15, 2012
20-04	251	Stagecoaches	Road reflectors	Fire-baked pottery	Custom motorcycle tanks	November 22, 2012
20-05	252	Replica clay pipes	Drinking fountains	Orange liqueur	Compound bows	November 29, 2012
20-06	253	Tissues	Travel trailers	Slippers	Motorcycle helmets	December 6, 2012
20-07	254	U-locks	Tepees	Croissants	Rolling luggage	December 13, 2012
20-08	255	Prams	Factory-built homes	Wood flutes	Bicycle tires	December 20, 2012
20-09	256	Thinning shears	Wagon Wheels	Toaster pastries	Violin bows	December 27, 2012
20-10	257	Cast iron tubs	Hopi Kachina dolls	Mine truck engine rebuild	Memory cards	January 3, 2013
20-11	258	Cycling shoes	Yurts	Marine plywood	Oil and encaustic paint	January 10, 2013
20-12	259	Paper fans	Walnut oil	Copper		January 17, 2013
20-13	260	Gut strings	Absinthe	Belt buckles	Lever locks	January 24, 2013

=== Season 21 (2013) ===
Series Ep.	Episode	Segment A	Segment B	Segment C	Segment D	Air Dates
21-01	261	Rubber gloves	Soap carvings	Aircraft cabinets	Motorcycle brake locks	April 4, 2013
21-02	262	Powder horns	Handcrafted moulds	Pierogies	Inner tubes	April 11, 2013
21-03	263	Lace	Antique frame replicas	Orchids	Unicycle wheel hubs	April 18, 2013
21-04	264	External hard drives	Frozen shrimp	Thai rice boxes	Paper towels	April 25, 2013
21-05	265	Tea	Roof finials	Artificial flowers	Alloy wheels	May 2, 2013
21-06	266	Gel caps	Playground spring riders	Frozen pancakes	Natural rubber	May 9, 2013
21-07	267	Paper umbrellas	Coal	Aircraft seats	Cremation urns	May 16, 2013
21-08	268	Aluminium canoes	Wooden stave bowls	Wheelchair accessible vans	Marimbas	May 23, 2013
21-09	269	Indy car seats	Paper flowers	Standby generators		May 30, 2013
21-10	270	Customized knee replacements	Leaf springs	Lavender essential oil	Rivets and rivet tools	June 6, 2013
21-11	271	Cast iron stoves	Ultralight aircraft	Snow groomers	Rubber bands	June 13, 2013
21-12	272	Barber chairs	Sewage pumps	Bimini boat tops	Diesel filters	June 20, 2013
21-13	273	Car tires	Silk	Art conservation	Scuba tanks	June 27, 2013

=== Season 22 (2013–2014) ===
Series Ep.	Episode	Segment A	Segment B	Segment C	Segment D	Air Dates
22-01	274	Electric stand-up vehicles	Frozen fruit	Beer coasters	Forged door handles	October 17, 2013
22-02	275	Rock crushers	Fabric lampshades	Cake sprinkles/Hundreds & Thousands	Steam irons	October 24, 2013
22-03	276	Indy steering wheels	Mixed salad	Wind turbines		October 31, 2013
22-04	277	Blast doors	Lipstick	Artificial palm trees	Brass plaques	November 7, 2013
22-05	278	Carbon fibre	Antique frame restoration	Railcar movers	Hood ornaments	November 14, 2013
22-06	279	Sawhorses and toolboxes	Sorbet pops	School buses		November 21, 2013
22-07	280	Sanders	Solid terrain models	Stucco	High-speed roll-up doors	November 28, 2013
22-08	281	Pressed glass	Pickup truck caps	Alpaca yarn	Utility knives	December 5, 2013
22-09	282	Life casting	Downdraft cooktops	Compression hosiery	Electric motorcycles	December 12, 2013
22-10	283	Motorcycle sidecars	Frozen French toast	Refrigerator compressors	Superchargers	December 19, 2013
22-11	284	Custom knee braces	Ductless air conditioners	Window film	Motorcycle exhaust systems	December 26, 2013
22-12	285	Solid-state drives	Eye shadow	Limousines	Dead-blow hammers	January 2, 2014
22-13	286	Dragster tires	Icing	Floating docks	Spiral pipes	January 9, 2014

=== Season 23 (2014) ===
Series Ep.	Episode	Segment A	Segment B	Segment C	Segment D	Air Dates
23-01	287	Motion sensors	Belt loaders	Pheasant breeding	Diving helmets	April 10, 2014
23-02	288	Rawhide lampshades	Chocolate chip cookies	MRI scanners		April 17, 2014
23-03	289	Noise barrier walls	Front-load washers	Bourbon	Flexible circuit boards	April 24, 2014
23-04	290	Railway bridge ties	Membrane filters	Hydraulic post drivers	Biplanes	May 1, 2014
23-05	291	Hospital laundry	Brass instrument restoration	Horse replicas	Excavation buckets	May 8, 2014
23-06	292	Ceramic fireplaces	Synthetic corks	Parking garage floor slabs		May 15, 2014
23-07	293	Oil pressure sensors	Large format printing	Heavy equipment simulators	Head and neck restraints	May 22, 2014
23-08	294	Mobile concert stages	Mascara	Continuous miners	Wood gift boxes	May 29, 2014
23-09	295	NASCAR car bodies	Hurley sticks	Tube power amplifiers	Thermal coffee pots	June 5, 2014
23-10	296	Electric vehicle charging stations	Grappa	Lunar rover replicas		June 12, 2014
23-11	297	Slate tiles	Hot dog carts	Garage door openers	Bicycle seats	June 19, 2014
23-12	298	Racing leathers	Evaporative cooling towers	Wood rocking chairs	Wire wheels	June 26, 2014
23-13	299	Mountain bikes	Rice	Lever action rifles		July 3, 2014

=== Season 24 (2014–2015) ===
Series Ep.	Episode	Segment A	Segment B	Segment C	Segment D	Air Dates
24-01	300	Saunas	Wheelchair lifts	Dioramas		October 23, 2014
24-02	301	Oil lamps	Chocolate mints	Underfloor heating	Pillows	October 30, 2014
24-03	302	Upright pianos	Flags	Wet/dry vacuums	Medieval axes	November 6, 2014
24-04	303	Skeletal replicas	Ice buckets and servers	Dining chairs	In-ground pools	November 13, 2014
24-05	304	Automatic sliding doors	Gin	Firearms restoration	Submarine restoration	November 20, 2014
24-06	305	Scuba diving lights	Interchangeable sandals	Race car simulators	Fiberglass doors	November 27, 2014
24-07	306	Wood windows	Woven cashmere fabric	Plastic recycling machines	Architectural glass	December 4, 2014
24-08	307	Gas barbecues	Mattress pads	Ear prostheses		December 11, 2014
24-09	308	Recycled skateboards	Braided pastries	Construction trailers	Metalworking vises	December 18, 2014
24-10	309	Plasma gems	Special effects snow	Piano restoration	Marine Engines	December 25, 2014
24-11	310	3-wheel electric bikes	Skin cream	Patio heaters	Wood Spoke Wheels	January 1, 2015
24-12	311	Old West holsters	Underwater video housings	Soy beverages	Pet nail trimmers	January 8, 2015
24-13	312	Wood garage doors	Sand and salt spreaders	Animatronic dinosaurs		January 15, 2015

=== Season 25 (2015) ===
Series Ep.	Episode	Segment A	Segment B	Segment C	Segment D	Air Dates
25-01	313	Grammy Awards	Bicycle lights	Above-ground pools	Foldable solar panels	April 2, 2015
25-02	314	LED stage lights	Apple cider	Chemical tank trailers	Ornate stone floors	April 9, 2015
25-03	315	Fishing line	Industrial mixers	Natural baking soda	Tow trucks	April 16, 2015
25-04	316	Storage sheds	Industrial fans	Parchment paper	Climbing walls	April 23, 2015
25-05	317	Precast concrete walls	3D printers	Telescopic cranes	Kerosene lamp burners	April 30, 2015
25-06	318	Car headlamps	Directional drills	Pet grooming combs	Stained glass restoration	May 7, 2015
25-07	319	Handcrafted skis	Septic tanks	Hydroformed chassis parts	Aquarium windows	May 14, 2015
25-08	320	Zip line brakes	Silk fibre lamps	Round balers	Comfort shoes	May 21, 2015
25-09	321	Armored vehicles	Tension fabric buildings	Rowers	Sculpture enlargements	May 28, 2015
25-10	322	Mountain bike suspensions	Surgical sutures	Grain dryers	Frying pans	June 4, 2015
25-11	323	Downhill ski bindings	Immersion parts washers	Mining ventilation	Pencil sharpeners	June 11, 2015
25-12	324	Gingerbread houses	Livestock trailers	Bottom rolling hangar doors	Toy figurines	June 18, 2015
25-13	325	Traffic signal poles	Coffee filters	Chainsaw mining machines	Jet fighters	June 25, 2015

=== Season 26 (2015) ===
Series Ep.	Episode	Segment A	Segment B	Segment C	Segment D	Air Dates
26-01	326	Time-delay locks	Brownies	Pallet dispensers	Crystal chandeliers	September 10, 2015
26-02	327	Bead wire	Mini pepperoni	Irrigation sprinklers	Leather gloves	September 17, 2015
26-03	328	Mouth-blown window glass	Water pumps	Sake	Tweezers	September 24, 2015
26-04	329	Statue restoration	Tripods	Polish sausages	Welding guns	October 1, 2015
26-05	330	Champagne	ATMs	Marine turbochargers		October 8, 2015
26-06	331	Sharpening steel	Bladder pumps	Ironing boards	Kayak paddles	October 15, 2015
26-07	332	Champagne hoods & foils	Pneumatic delivery systems	Espresso machines	Pizza ovens	October 22, 2015
26-08	333	Stile-and-rail doors	Steam cleaners	Hand-held pizzas	Power brushes	October 29, 2015
26-09	334	Industrial casters	Wedding cakes	Terahertz spectrometers	Racing catamarans	November 5, 2015
26-10	335	Ceramic Grills	Pneumatic punching machines	Water jet fountains	Hollow wooden surfboards	November 12, 2015
26-11	336	Vibrating mining screens	Whoopie pies	Wood utility poles	Roller conveyors	November 19, 2015
26-12	337	Exercise bikes	Cornish pasties	Pasta makers	Slate products	November 26, 2015
26-13	338	Channel signs	Wetsuits	Aluminum aircraft		December 3, 2015

=== Season 27 (2016) ===
Series Ep.	Episode	Segment A	Segment B	Segment C	Segment D	Air Dates
27-01	339	CNC assembly machines	Lemon tarts	Miniature war figures		May 23, 2016
27-02	340	Chemical tank pressure vents	Candy wafers	Food trucks	Traditional ropes	May 30, 2016
27-03	341	Graphene	World's Smallest Car	Force testers	Composite Cans	June 6, 2016
27-04	342	LED tubes	Chocolate peanut butter bars	Robotic medication dispensers		June 13, 2016
27-05	343	Commercial drones	Aquarium fish	Runway cleaners	Shuttlecocks	June 20, 2016
27-06	344	Wooden matches	Tillage machines	Telescopic gangways	Mabe pearls	June 27, 2016
27-07	345	Mosquito coils	Solar-assist tricycles	Palm oil	Fiberglass chopper guns	July 4, 2016
27-08	346	Wood toys	Retro toasters	Laboratory furnaces	Aerogel	July 11, 2016
27-09	347	Combination squares	Farmed shrimp	Ball valves	String trimmers	July 18, 2016
27-10	348	Chinese-style furniture	Electrical switches	Thai fish sauce	Cappers	July 25, 2016
27-11	349	Mortars and pestles	Bowling lane conditioners	Crematories	Wood playsets	August 1, 2016
27-12	350	Race car oil tanks	Plaster mouldings	Lemongrass oil	Fly tying vises	August 8, 2016
27-13	351	Coconut shell charcoal	Dial indicators	Wet downdraft tables	Bassoon reeds	August 15, 2016

=== Season 28 (2016) ===
Series Ep.	Episode	Segment A	Segment B	Segment C	Segment D	Air Dates
28-01	352	Classic car gauges	Chocolate marble truffle cake	Ghillie Kettles	Condoms (now rubber gloves)	August 22, 2016
28-02	353	Pasta dies	Blueberries	Composting toilets	Surge Arresters	August 29, 2016
28-03	354	Angle grinders	Berry baskets	Omnidirectional speakers		September 5, 2016
28-04	355	Cartridge blades	Chocolate banana loaves	Vending machines	Dive computers	September 12, 2016
28-05	356	Ultra-thin glass	Pallet dismantling machines	Cupcakes	Seamless stainless steel tubing	September 19, 2016
28-06	357	Potash	Leather bracelets	Wild rice	Hex key L wrenches	September 26, 2016
28-07	358	Metal nail files	Birch bark canoes	Cruiser boat hardtops	High-voltage circuit breakers	October 3, 2016
28-08	359	Macarons	Pine needle baskets	Micrometers		October 10, 2016
28-09	360	Endoscopes	Megaphones	Uranium		October 17, 2016
28-10	361	Hollow disk pumps	Palm sugar	Yachts		October 24, 2016
28-11	362	Abalone collagen	Digital-to-analog converters	Embossed wood mouldings	Plier staplers	October 31, 2016
28-12	363	Thai barbecues	Diving masks & fins	Bassoons		November 7, 2016
28-13	364	Wooden utensils	Transport refrigeration units	Moccasins	Electronic impact drills	November 14, 2016

=== Season 29 (2017) ===
Series Ep.	Episode	Segment A	Segment B	Segment C	Segment D	Air Dates
29-01	365	Skateboard wheels	Baklava and galactoboureko	CO₂ scrubbers	Honeycomb candles	June 26, 2017
29-02	366	Nuno felt	Drum crushers	Kimchi	Parquet floors	July 2, 2017
29-03	367	Wood watches	Steel bicycles	Raw pet food	Replica police lanterns	July 9, 2017
29-04	368	Thermoplastic fire helmets	Basketry sculptures	Coffee roasters		July 16, 2017
29-05	369	Office chairs	Vinobrew	Reconditioned sander drums	Lithographs	July 23, 2017
29-06	370	Fireplace bellows	Calissons	Diving watercraft		July 30, 2017
29-07	371	Artist brushes	DEF tank heaters	Game tables	Art glass wall sconces	August 6, 2017
29-08	372	Flying water bikes	Throttle position sensors	Cinnamon cordial	Handmade rasps	August 13, 2017
29-09	373	Foosball tables	Marseille soap	Laguiole knives		August 20, 2017
29-10	374	Berets	Pastis	Stationary bikes		August 27, 2017
29-11	375	Steel bistro sets	Letterpress printing	Bamboo ceramic lights	Asphalt compactors	September 4, 2017
29-12	376	Technological corks	Zinc gutters	Traditional Basque ham	Chisteras	September 11, 2017
29-13	377	Pétanque balls	Biologic medicines	Asphalt pavers	Basque espadrilles	September 18, 2017

=== Season 30 (2017) ===
Series Ep.	Episode	Segment A	Segment B	Segment C	Segment D	Air Dates
30-01	378	Leather basketballs	Flood gates	Wood panel canvases	Shoelaces	September 25, 2017
30-02	379	Power steering pumps	Asian bowl meals	Walking canes		October 2, 2017
30-03	380	Plant oil extractors	Custom-made chandeliers	Power trainers	Coffee pods	October 9, 2017
30-04	381	Witness samples	Pressure washers	Beehives	Cast iron cookers	October 16, 2017
30-05	382	Leather sculptures	Travel hot plates	Ochre	Hurdy-gurdies	October 23, 2017
30-06	383	Recycling skateboard guitars	Solar street lights	Dolls		October 30, 2017
30-07	384	Spiral stairs	Pita bread	Exhaust headers	Moulded limestone artwork	November 6, 2017
30-08	385	Glass sculptures	Racing pulley systems	Inductors	Medicine balls	November 13, 2017
30-09	386	Fish rubbings	Clay shooting machines	Almonds	High-end motorcycles	November 20, 2017
30-10	387	Throttle bodies	Limestone fireplace mantels	Candied fruit & fruit jellies	Linen ukuleles	November 27, 2017
30-11	388	Rubber balls	Motion chairs	Montreal smoked meat	E-scooters	December 4, 2017
30-12	389	Aerospace fasteners	Cactus pear purée	Lab reactors		December 11, 2017
30-13	390	Wall beds	Sundae cups	Digital paintings	Badminton rackets	December 18, 2017

=== Season 31 (2018) ===
Series Ep.	Episode	Segment A	Segment B	Segment C	Segment D	Air Dates
31-01	391	Basque pelota balls	Pallet trucks	Dumplings	Brass faucets	May 5, 2018
31-02	392	Laptops	Panettone	Saxophones		May 12, 2018
31-03	393	Spinning reels	Plasma protein therapies	3D cups	Stainless steel beer kegs	May 19, 2018
31-04	394	Steamer baskets	Three-wheel scooters	Prefabricated conservatories	Copper cookware	May 26, 2018
31-05	395	Mountain bike tires	Leaf and debris vacuums	Canned meat	Fillet knives	June 2, 2018
31-06	396	Rice cookers	Concealment furniture	Promotional origami	Hedge shears	June 9, 2018
31-07	397	Glass faucets	Fire truck ladders	Antique clock restoration	Barbecue utensils	June 16, 2018
31-08	398	Educational robots	Boxing belts	Boat radar mounts	European-style radiators	June 23, 2018
31-09	399	Cotton	Rodeo roping chutes	Asian noodles	Rotary engines	June 30, 2018
31-10	400	Sleeper rigs	Pecans	Steel pulleys	Acetate eyewear	July 7, 2018
31-11	401	Wood slat baskets	Bells	Gyroscopic stabilizers		July 14, 2018
31-12	402	DeLorean restoration	Bison fibre	Shuffleboard tables	Friction-forged knives	July 21, 2018
31-13	403	Leather overnight bags	Horse exercisers	Air hockey tables	Copper sculptures	July 28, 2018

=== Season 32 (2019) ===
Series Ep.	Episode	Segment A	Segment B	Segment C	Segment D	Air Dates
32-01	404	Electrophoretic displays	Dry-erase boards	Air rifles	Quartz countertops	February 10, 2019
32-02	405	Custom shoe trees	Clay targets	Squeeze chutes	Composite boat propellers	February 17, 2019
32-03	406	Orthodontic retainers	Orange juice	Retractable saunas	Sawmill blade knives	February 24, 2019
32-04	407	Table tennis tables	Plastic model kits	Light microscopes		March 3, 2019
32-05	408	Hand-forged hammers	Gummy vitamins	Boat trailers	Tea lights & jar candles	March 10, 2019
32-06	409	Guitar pickups	Heated furniture	Water well cylinders	Non-conductive tools	March 17, 2019
32-07	410	Innerspring mattresses	Stand-up paddleboards	Vacuum cleaners		March 24, 2019
32-08	411	Belts	3D metal printers	Detectable warning panels	Model Stirling engines	March 31, 2019
32-09	412	Compression & extension springs	Micro Drill bits	Skiffs	Painted glass backsplashes	April 7, 2019
32-10	413	Fencing masks	Books	Ocean drone transformers	3D puzzles	April 14, 2019
32-11	414	Tin whistles	Horn products	Formula F race cars		April 21, 2019
32-12	415	Motorcycle goggles	Hand-built jukeboxes	Vacuum excavators	Pewter shaving sets	April 28, 2019
32-13	416	Peaked caps	Custom water heaters	Electric boats	Fencing foils	May 5, 2019

== Specials ==
Special	Segment A	Segment B	Segment C	Segment D
Home Run Edition	Baseballs	Artificial turf	Baseball gloves	Carbon fibre bats
Valentine's Day Edition	Luxury chocolates	Lipstick	Hot tubs	Cultured diamonds
Punkin Chunkin Edition	Carbon fibre	Industrial wire ropes	Mountain bikes	Gears
Halloween Edition	Animatronics	Metal caskets	Latex swords	Bulk chocolate

== Season and episodes notes ==
- The "Historical Capsule" segment in Season 1, episode 9 incorrectly states that Florence Nightingale founded the Elizabeth Arden cosmetics company in 1930. In fact, the company was founded by Florence Nightingale Graham.
- The background music in the "Pipe Organs" segment of Season 2, episode 2 is called "Variations for Organ on 'O Filii et Filiæ', Opus 49, No. 2" by French organist and composer Alexandre Guilmant.
- The "Techno Flash" segment was removed from the third season, and the "Historical Capsule" segment was removed from the fifth season.
- In the U.S. version of the show, the "Condoms" segment in Season 28, episode 1 is replaced with the "Rubber Gloves" one, which is a duplicate of the same segment in Season 21, episode 1.
- The “Stop-frame Animation” segment focuses on the Aardman series Timmy Time, and a scene in the episode “Timmy and the Balloon”.
- The Science Channel in the U.S. lists the seasons differently from the original Canadian version of the show:

Original season listing	1	2	3	4	5	6	7	8	9	10	11	12	13	14	15	16	17	18	19	20	21	22	23	24	25	26	27	28 (ep. 1–10)	28 (ep. 11–13), 29, 30 (ep. 1–2)	31, 32, 30 (ep. 3–4)	30 (ep. 5–13)
Science Channel season listing	1		2		3		4		5		6		7		8	9	10	11	12	13	14	15	16	17	18	19	20	21	22	23	24
