= Nuts.com =

American food company

- Former name: Newark Nut Company
- Founded: 1929; 97 years ago
- Headquarters: Cranford, New Jersey, U.S.
- Founder: Sol Braverman
- Products: Bulk foods
- Website: nuts.com
- Launched: 1999; 27 years ago

Nuts.com, founded as the Newark Nut Company in 1929, is a company that specializes in the sale of bulk foods including nuts, popcorn, dried fruit, and candy. They also specialize in customer-focused strategies.

It experienced an increase in sales in 2020 during the COVID-19 pandemic.
