= Print butter =

Print butter is an obsolete term for butter that was sold in wrappers printed with "some emblematic device" as a branding device as modern butter almost always is. Originally the wrappers were normally cloth and sometimes washed and returned for re-use by the retailer. By the late 19th century greaseproof paper took over from cloth. The term is found in American sources from at least 1791 to 1949. Packages of butter which were wrapped were called prints (for example, pound prints weighed one pound each).

The conceptual distinction of print butter, as opposed to any other type of butter, merited a separate name up until the mid-20th century, as before that time many people got their dairy products (milk, butter, cheese), eggs, and produce in ways that did not involve much branding or packaging—for example, either produced at home (in the case of family farms, which were formerly widespread), directly from a farmer that produced them (via either a regular delivery route or at the town market), or from any of various resellers who bought from farmers and resold (for example, grocer, huckster, or sutler). Unlike today when even bulk foods at a supermarket are usually labeled to show who produced them, in the past, the pickles or peanuts bought from a barrel at the general store, or the produce bought from a huckster's cart, were usually not labeled, let alone branded. Thus the idea of prepackaged units with branded labels was worthy of a differentiating name, somewhat similar to how "name-brand merchandise" is still differentiable from "generic merchandise" or "bulk commodities" today.

References to print butter remain in the US state of Connecticut legal code, requiring print butter to have the net weight printed in Gothic letters at least one-half inch high.
