= Storefront =

Facade or entryway of a retail store

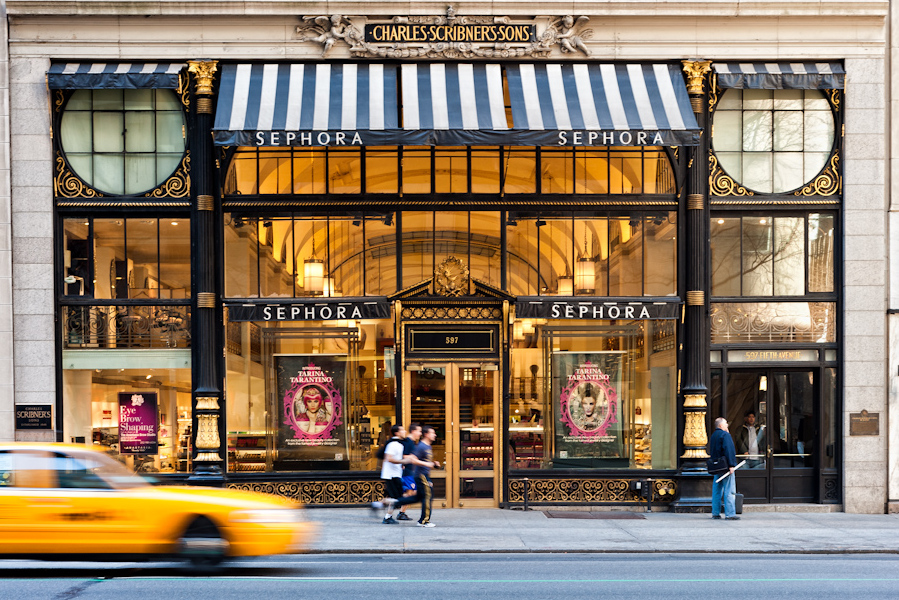
The flagship storefront of Sephora on Fifth Avenue in Midtown Manhattan, New York City

A storefront or shopfront is the facade or entryway of a retail store located on the ground floor or street level of a commercial building, typically including one or more display windows. A storefront functions to attract visual attention to a business and its merchandise.

== History ==
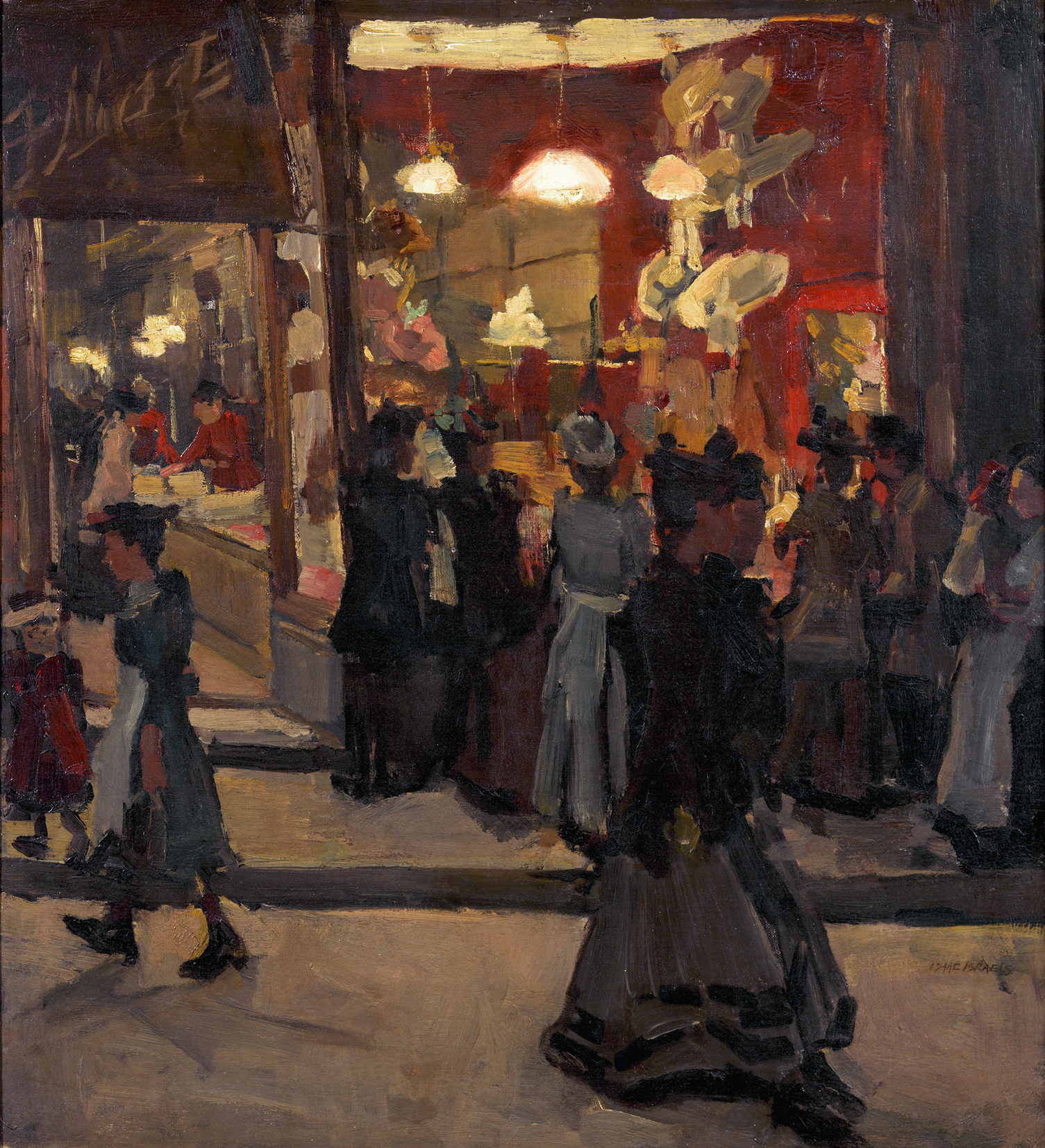
Hat shop, painted by Isaac Israëls c. 1895

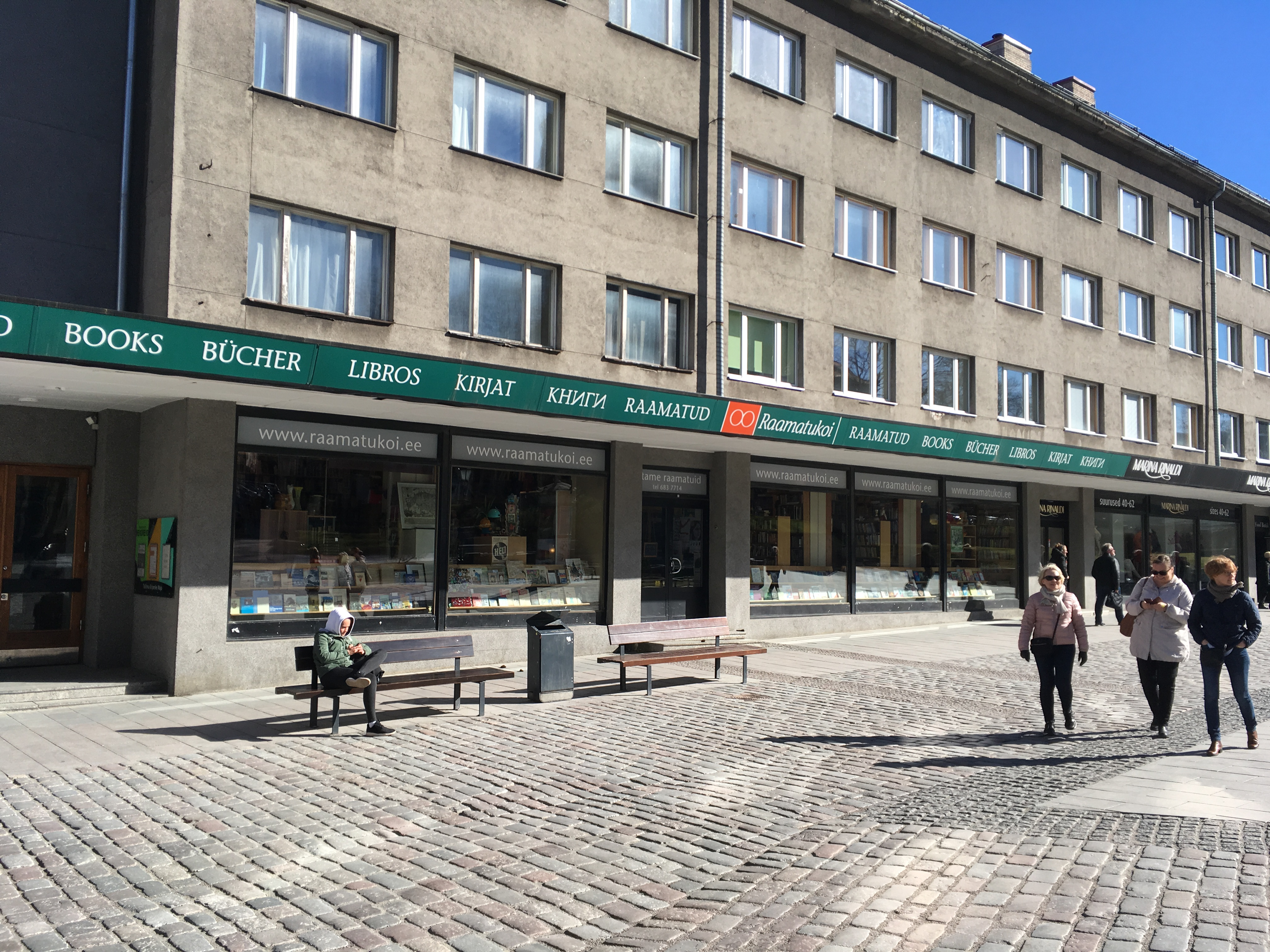
Storefront of a bookshop in Tallinn

Before the middle of the 19th century, storefronts did not have large display windows, but often included features such as awnings and bay windows to attract the attention of passersby. Modern storefronts with display windows developed at mid-century after architectural cast iron became widely available and glass manufacturers began producing large panes of glass at relatively low cost.

In the United States, storefronts with large windows become available after 1883, when the Pittsburgh Plate Glass company started to produce plate glass. Also architects started to experiment with iron columns and lintels at the ground floor level.The combination of these two achievements led to the storefront as we know it today. By the 1920s, storefront plans with deep display windows, known as the “arcaded” front, had become popular.

== Storefront designs ==
The storefronts of commercial buildings are often substantially altered even when other architectural elements remain intact. Such alterations can adversely affect a historic building's architectural and historic character. Storefronts can also have an area in front of the unit called a "pop-out zone", which is about 500-1000 mm deep. Storefronts often use channel letters.

== Other uses ==
E-commerce websites are sometimes called "online storefronts" or "virtual storefronts".

== See also ==
- Brick and mortar
- Boutique
- Digital economy
- Digital currency
- Online shopping
- shopping cart
- Storefront church
- Storefront school
