= How It's Made =

Canadian television series

- Created by: Gabriel Hoss
- Presented by: Canada; Mark Tewksbury (season 1); Lynn Herzeg (seasons 2–4); June Wallack (season 5); Lynne Adams (seasons 6–32); United States; Brooks Moore; Zac Fine (seasons 9–10); United Kingdom; Tony Hirst
- Countries of origin: Canada; United States
- Original language: English
- No. of seasons: 32 (Note: Based on the Canadian version. The U.S. version has 24 seasons in total.)
- No. of episodes: 416 (list of episodes)

Production
- Running time: 21 minutes
- Production companies: Productions MAJ, Inc.

Original release
- Network: Z (Quebec); Discovery Channel (Canada); Science Channel (United States)
- Release: January 6, 2001 – May 5, 2019

How It's Made (French: Comment c'est fait) is a documentary television series that focuses on the manufacturing processes of everyday items. It premiered on January 6, 2001 on the Discovery Channel/USA Network in Canada, and later on the Science Channel in the United States. The program is produced in Quebec by Productions MAJ, Inc. and Productions MAJ 2. Production of the show ended in late 2018, and the final episode aired on May 5, 2019.

== Format ==
The series is a documentary that demonstrates how everyday items such as clothing and accessories, food, industrial products, musical instruments, electronics, and sporting goods are manufactured. Some episodes also cover the restoration processes and other industrial activities, including sorting mail, processing wastewater, packaging fruit, and recycling metal. While most segments were filmed in factories, the crew also visited small workshops and traditional artisans, such as Native American turquoise jewelry makers.

How It's Made does not include explanatory texts to simplify dubbing in different languages. The show does not feature an onscreen host (excluding season 1 in the Canadian version) or interviews with employees. Instead, an off-screen narrator explains the process, often with puns and analogies.

Each episode features three or four products divided by segments, with each product getting a demonstration of approximately five minutes. Some episodes dedicate two 5-minute segments to more complex manufacturing processes.

The "Historical Capsule" segment, included until season 5, introduces historical background information for the last featured product in each episode, showing how and where the product originated, and what people used before it. It presents a series of single-line drawings which got colored for a brief amount of time after completed.

The "Techno flash" segment briefly introduces some novelty from industry or science development (such as hydrogen fuel cell cars), and it was only used in seasons 1 and 2.

== Variants ==
=== Original concept (1982–1999) ===
Before the current How It's Made series, an earlier version with the same title was produced in Canada between 1982 and 1999 by filmmaker Gabriel Hoss.

The original series comprised 36 short films of about four minutes each, covering the production of everyday objects such as croissant, light bulbs, boots, beer, soap, and chips. Unlike the later version, these programs had no narration; instead, the processes were shown with instrumental music and bilingual (English and French) opening and closing credits.

Produced by Hoss's company Holia Film, the series aired in Canada on broadcasters including TVOntario (now TVO), CFCF-DT, Radio-Québec (later Télé-Québec), and CKCO-DT, and was also shown on PBS in the United States. Between 1982 and 1999, it was distributed in roughly 30 countries worldwide by The Multimedia Group of Canada.

=== Regional versions ===
The show’s scripts are nearly identical across regional English versions of the show, with the main differences in the United States version being the use of United States customary units instead of the metric units used in the Canadian version, along with a few dialectal variations, such as “expiration date” instead of “expiry date.” The United Kingdom dub sometimes uses different puns and closing statements.

Narrators also varied by region. In Canada’s English version, Season 1 (2001) is narrated by Mark Tewksbury, followed by Lynn Herzeg for seasons 2–4 (2002–2004), June Wallack for season 5 (2005), and Lynne Adams from season 6 onwards (2006–2019). In the United States, narration is provided by Brooks Moore, and Zac Fine (seasons 9–10, 2007–2008). In the United Kingdom, the rest of Europe, and parts of Southeast Asia, the English dub is narrated by Tony Hirst.

== Spin-offs ==
In June 2008, the Science Channel added How It's Made: Remix, which consists of previous segments arranged into theme installments like "Food", "Sporting Goods", and such.

In 2013, a spinoff entitled How It's Made: Dream Cars, which focused exclusively on high-performance and exotic cars, premiered. This series was later shown on the Velocity (now Discovery Turbo) channel. Unlike the main series, which rarely mentioned products by brand name due to Canadian product placement laws, this series went into the history of specific automotive companies and their brand identities.

== Critical reception ==
Common Sense Media gave the TV show a rating of 4/5 stars, writing "Curious kids and adults will learn from the show, and some segments can really broaden your perspective". On the show's success despite its formulaic nature, Rita Mullin, the general manager of the Science Channel, said "I think what is one of the great appeals of the show as a viewer myself is how little has changed over the years". The Wall Street Journal deemed it "TV's quietest hit".

== Accolades ==
Year	Award	Category	Recipient(s)	Result	Ref.
2014	Young Artist Award	Social Relations of Knowledge Institute Award	How It's Made	Awarded	

== In popular culture ==
The show's style is spoofed in the Rick and Morty episode "Interdimensional Cable 2: Tempting Fate", showing how a "Plumbus" is being made.
