= Brooks Moore =

American television narrator

Brooks Turner Moore is an American television narrator who has primarily provided voiceovers for programs broadcast on the Discovery Channel and its related networks (namely Science Channel). His most prominent work is his narration in United States broadcasts of the Canadian television series How It's Made. From seasons 9-10 (2007-2008), he was replaced by Zac Fine. However, Moore returned for the 11th season (2008–2009) following a fan petition to bring him back; he remained the show's narrator until its cancellation in 2019. Moore also narrated the spin-off How It's Made Dream Cars, as well as Judge Faith and works in the fields of directing and producing.
