= Sprouts Farmers Market =

American supermarket chain

Sprouts Farmers Market, Inc.
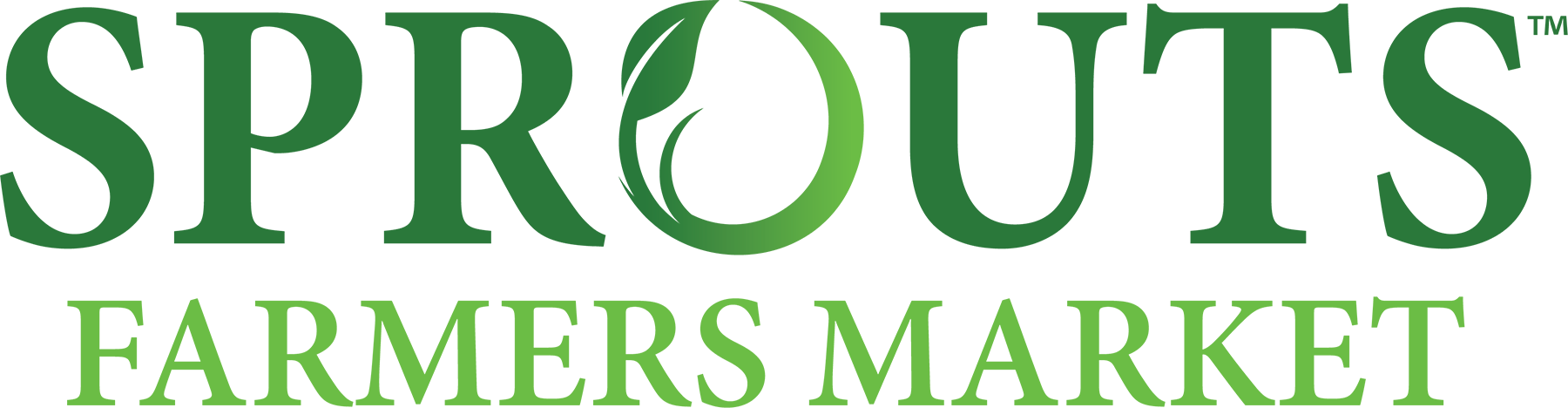

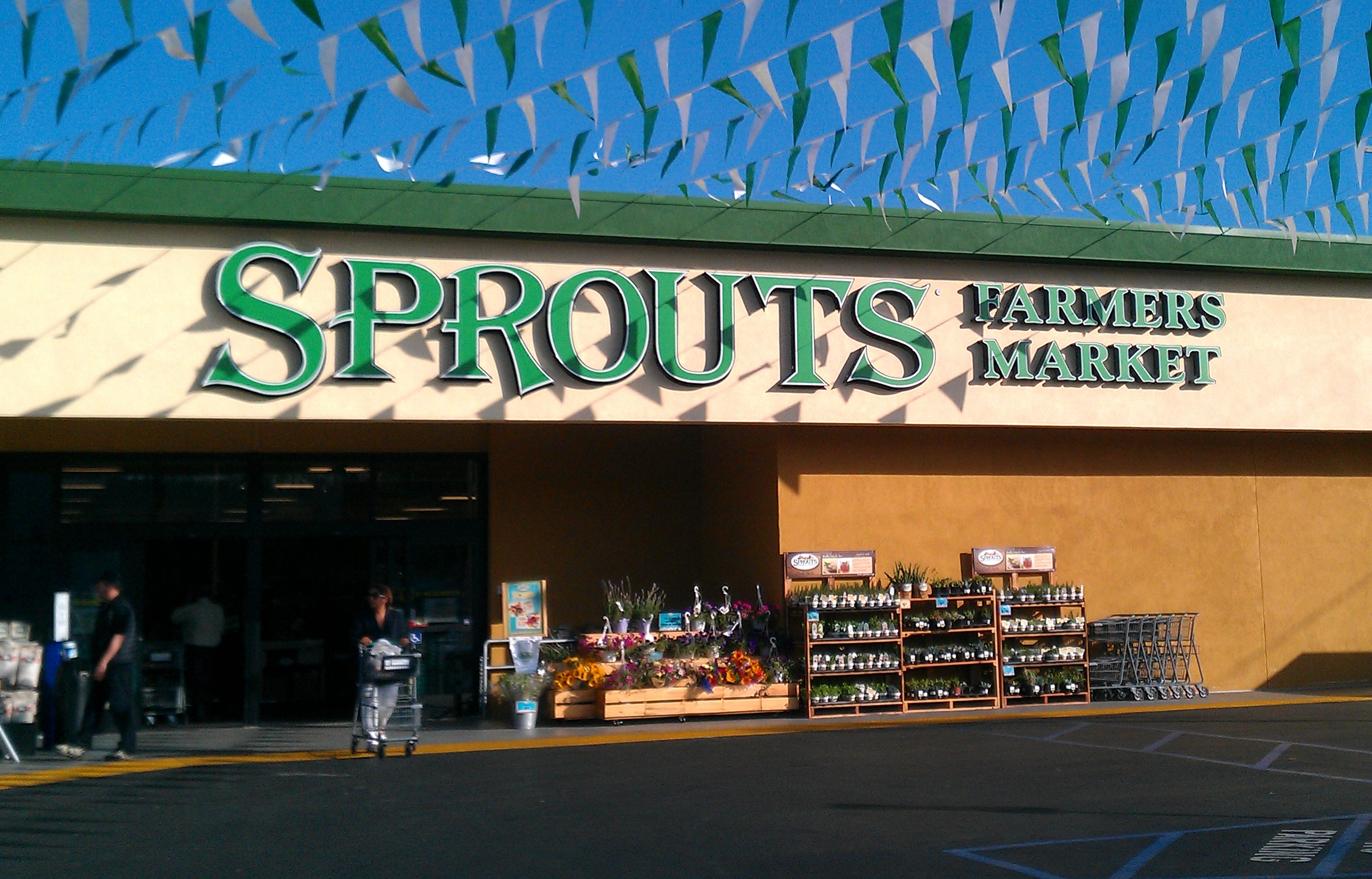
- Sprouts Farmers Market, Westwood Blvd., Los Angeles, California
- Type: Public
- Traded as: Nasdaq: SFM; S&P 400 Component
- Industry: Retail
- Genre: Grocery store, health food store
- Founded: July 2002; 24 years ago, in Chandler, Arizona, US
- Headquarters: 5455 E. High Street, #111, Phoenix, Arizona, US
- Number of locations: 483 (2026)
- Area served: 24 states in the U.S.
- Key people: Jack Sinclair (CEO); Nick Konat (president and COO)
- Products: Groceries
- Services: Bulk Foods; Meat; Seafood; Deli; Sandwich Bar; Vitamins; Supplements; Catering
- Revenue: ▲US$6.837 billion (2023)
- Operating income: ▼US$350 million (2023)
- Net income: ▼US$258 million (2023)
- Total assets: ▲US$3.327 billion (2023)
- Total equity: ▲US$1.148 billion (2023)
- Number of employees: 35,000 (2020)
- Website: sprouts.com

Sprouts Farmers Market, Inc., is a supermarket chain headquartered in Phoenix, Arizona, offering natural and organic foods, including fresh produce, bulk foods, packaged groceries, meat, poultry, seafood, deli, baked goods, dairy products, and frozen foods. They also sell vitamins and supplements, natural body care, and household items. Sprouts employs 35,000 workers and operates more than 400 stores in 24 states.

== History ==
In 1943, Henry Boney opened a fresh-fruit stand in San Diego, California, which grew into a handful of open-air farmers markets. In 1969, his sons developed Boney's Market, which grew into a community grocery store. By 1997, the family's small-box farmers-market grocery stores were renamed Henry's Farmers Market after their father. Sprouts Farmers Market was founded in 2002 in Chandler, Arizona by members of the Boney family.

In 2011, Henry's, Sun Harvest, and Sprouts came together again under Apollo Global Management, and all were rebranded as Sprouts stores. In 2012, Sunflower was acquired and was rebranded Sprouts. Sprouts became a public company traded on NASDAQ in 2013. In 2015, Apollo Global Management exited its position in the company by selling off 10.4% of Sprout’s overall stock, or about 15.8 million shares. This represented all of the remaining stock in Sprouts owned by Apollo.

Fortune included Sprouts on its list of the World's Most Admired Companies in 2018 and 2019.

== Philanthropic efforts ==
=== Charitable donations ===
In 2015, Sprouts founded the Healthy Communities Foundation, which supports local health and wellness-related causes. Since then, the foundation has awarded more than $18 million to nonprofit partners across 23 states.

In 2021, the foundation gave away more than $3 million in grants to over 115 organizations.

=== MyFitnessPal collaboration ===
Also in 2021, Sprouts Farmers Market partnered with MyFitnessPal to provide food-related content support to the app, which included a library of healthy recipes, health and fitness challenges, and food- and health-related articles.

=== Sustainability ===
Sprouts participates in a food waste diversion program that provides food to those in need, feed for animals, and nutrients for agricultural soil. All edible food that is no longer fit for sale is donated to hunger-relief agencies, and food that is not fit for them is donated as cattle feed. Everything else is donated as compost.

In 2019, the U.S. Environmental Protection Agency recognized Sprouts with several recognitions through its GreenChill program, a partnership with food retailers to reduce refrigerant emissions and decrease their impact on the ozone layer and climate change.

== Criticisms ==
=== Terminology misuse ===
The store's use of the term farmers market has been criticized by local farmers and food sovereignty advocates for appropriating a term they believe should be reserved for direct-to-consumer sales venues.

=== Animal welfare concerns ===
In April 2017, the network Direct Action Everywhere released the results of their investigation into Sprouts's cage-free egg supplier, Morning Fresh Farms. The report included a video showing chickens that were injured or starving due to lack of food and water. The Phoenix Business Journal covered the investigation and included comments from Sprouts, stating that Morning Fresh Farms had provided assurance that the video was not reflective of the farm's cage-free facility.

== Stores ==
Sprouts offers a selection of products that are minimally processed and free of artificial flavors, food coloring, preservatives, and synthetic ingredients. The company says that 90% of its products meet this standard.

The company operates its own private-label brand of products that includes more than 2,400 items. Stores offer beef products that range from choice cuts to grass-fed. Each store's vitamins and supplements department typically includes about 7,500 products. Produce makes up about a quarter of the business for Sprouts, and the stores carry around 200 varieties of organic produce. One-third of the store stock is always on promotion.

As of 2025, Sprouts operates locations in Alabama, Arizona, California, Colorado, Delaware, Florida, Georgia, Kansas, Louisiana, Maryland, Missouri, Nevada, New Jersey, New Mexico, New York, North Carolina, Oklahoma, Pennsylvania, South Carolina, Tennessee, Texas, Utah, Virginia, Washington, and Wyoming.
