= Downdraft table =

Ventilated workbench

Downdraft tables or downdraught benches are workbenches with built-in ventilation to capture dust, smoke, and fumes and draw them away from the operator and the material being worked on. They typically consist of a perforated surface whose underside is connected to a ventilation or dust collection system, to draw material through the holes and away from the work.
