= Conservation and restoration of historic firearms =

Preservation of heritage collections

The conservation and restoration of historic firearms is preventative care, damage repair, stabilization, replacement of missing components, and potentially the return of the firearm to firing capabilities. It requires an understanding of the different types of historic firearms and knowledge in the care and treatment of organic and inorganic materials, as firearms are composed of many types of materials, from wood to metal, that are fitted together.

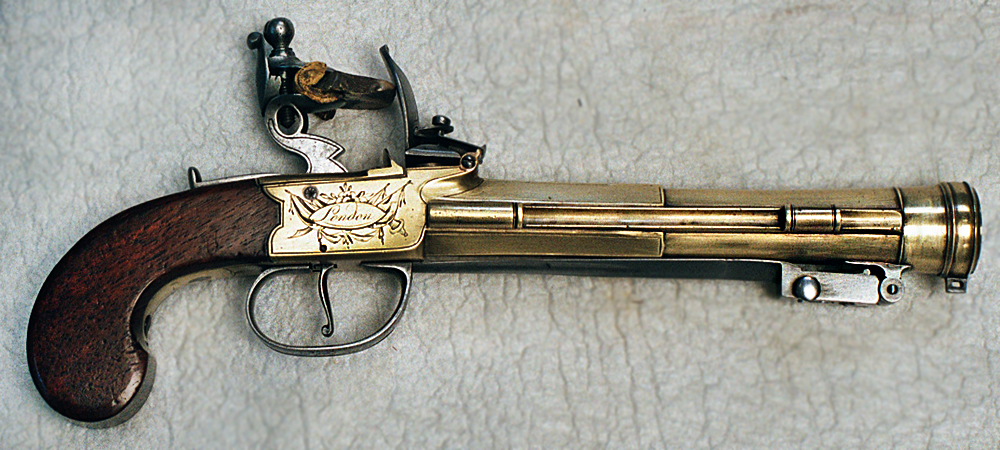
A restored 17th century pistol

== History ==
The term historic firearm refers to armaments used prior to the 20th Century. Firearms vary greatly in type, function, firing mechanisms, and decorative elements. Firearms are composite objects, meaning they are made of different materials. Generally, the core components of historic firearms are metal (iron, steel, brass) and wood. Decorative elements may include other metals like gold or silver, and organic materials such as bone, antler, and ivory. Animal hide and sinew may also have been used to repair damaged firearms or build a new weapon using multiple parts. Historic firearms are identified by barrel style, how they are loaded, and by lock, the firing mechanism. Firearms can first be classified by the barrel style which is described as either a smoothbore or rifle. The barrel of a smoothbore has a smooth interior whereas a rifle barrel has a helical grove cut into it Historic firearms may be grouped based on how they are loaded; they will be referred to as muzzle-loaded or breech-loaded. Muzzle-loaded firearms are loaded through the front end of the barrel and were typically left loaded and ready for use A muzzle-loaded firearm means that a lock was used to hold and ignite the gunpower which fired the gun. Breech-loaded firearms, first introduced in the 16th century, are loaded with cartridges or shells through the rear of the barrel and have a variety of ignition switches. A third way historic firearms can also be categorized is by their firing mechanism known as a lock. Several types of locks have been developed over the centuries; however, the most common types found in the United States are the matchlock, wheel-lock, flintlock, and percussion cap.

=== Types of Historic Firearms ===
The earliest lock was the Matchlock that used a match to ignite the powder. These were smoothbore and muzzle-loaded. The Harquebus (Arquebus) and muskets prior to the 17th century are two examples of a matchlock The Wheellock, was developed around 1500, used a spring loaded wheel to create an ignition. Like the matchlock, wheel-locks were smoothbore and muzzle-loaded. Muskets and pistols were made with the wheel-lock. Developed in the 17th century, the Flintlock used a flint strike to ignite the gunpower and fire the weapon. Flintlocks were used for a variety of firearms, ranging from pistols to muskets and rifles. Their barrels could be smoothbore or rifle and were muzzle-loaded or breech-loaded. The Percussion Cap was introduced in the early 1800s and eventually replaced the flintlock. The percussion cap lock was very similar to the flintlock and many flintlocks were converted into percussion caps. Percussion cap firearms were muzzle-loaded, but as with flintlocks, they could have a smooth or rifled barrel.

== Agents of Deterioration and Preventative Conservation ==
Navajo Rifle; Metal corrosion in composite object

Agents of deterioration are the forces that cause physical, chemical, and biological damage and lead to irreversible losses to museum collections Preventative conservators work to maintain the health of museum collections by taking steps to prevent or reduce the effects of agents of deterioration on objects.

=== Physical Forces ===
Physical forces may damage objects directly or cause indirect damage through the collision between the object and parts or other objects Damage to objects is the result of five possible physical forces: impact, shock, vibration, abrasion, and pressure. For historic firearms the highest risk of damage is from impact. If not held properly, there is a risk that the firearm may be dropped or bumped into surrounding objects or fixtures. Impact damage can also happen if the firearm is not mounted correctly when it is on display and it falls. Damage from impact may cause cracking, breaking, and chipping of wood and other organic materials; and may dent, scratch, or break off metal components. To reduce the risk of damage by physical forces, historic firearms should be supported with both hands and held in front of the body, have proper display mounts, and be stored in appropriate cases padded with microfoam. The person handling the firearm should exercise caution and be aware of his/her surroundings when moving the object to avoid bumping it into other firearms, objects, or fixtures.

=== Incorrect Temperature ===
Incorrect temperature can damage the wood components. A combination of long-term or excessive light exposure with high temperatures will cause the wood to crack and lose its shape. High temperatures will have a similar effect on rawhide and semi-tanned leather, ivory, bone, and antler. To slow the process of deterioration, historic firearms should be kept at temperatures kept below 72 °F (22 °C)

=== Incorrect Relative Humidity ===
Relative humidity affects both the wood and metal components of firearms. Too low of a humidity can cause the wood and other organic material to dry and crack. Humidity that is too high, above 65%, can cause the wood to swell, can corrode the metal, and conducive to mold growth. The preferred range for relative humidity is between 45% and 50%; however, accounting for seasonal changes an acceptable range is 35% to 60%. The preferred range of relative humidity for antler, bone, and ivory is 45% to 55% Rawhide or semi-tanned leather, if used on the firearm, is also affected by humidity. Animal hide will absorb moisture creating an ideal habitat for mold growth and if the humidity is too low, the hide will split or potentially damage the firearm. As with antler, bone, and ivory, animal hide is most stable with a relative humidity of 45% to 55%

=== Water ===
Water is damaging to most historic objects. For historic firearms, water will cause corrosion of metal components, swell wood, and encourage mold growth. Water will also cause antler, bone, and ivory to swell. Animal rawhide and semi-tanned leather will absorb moisture and will be at risk for mold growth. It could also become discolored. Historic firearms should be stored away or protected from potential water sources, such as exposed water pipes or off the ground if there is a risk of flooding.

=== Fire ===
Historic firearms are at risk for damage if they are exposed to fire and can result in the loss of the object. Wood and other organic materials will burn, and metal may melt or become disfigured. If the firearm has not been checked for residual gunpowder or lodged ammunition and is still loaded, the fire may ignite the gunpowder and result in an accidental discharge. Firearms should be kept away from combustible chemicals and objects.

=== Light, UV, Infrared ===
High light levels are harmful to the organic materials found on historic firearms. Long term or high intensity exposure to light will cause darkening or fading of wood, ivory, bone, and antler, depending on the material. Exposure to UV light will fade and bleach wood, and infrared light will dry and fade the wood components. To prevent damage from light exposure, UV filters can be used on lights and window and display glass. Light sources for display cases should be positioned outside of the case. After reaching the maximum exposure of 100 lux for eight hours per day, six days a week for a year, the historic firearm should be removed from display and stored in a box or cabinet.

=== Pests ===
Pests are insects and animals that disfigure, damage, and destroy museum collections The organic materials on historic firearms are susceptible to pest infestation. Woodboring beetle s and rodents are a threat to the wood materials. Bone, antler, ivory, and rawhide or semi-tanned leather attract Dermestidae, as the black carpet beetle and black larder beetle which feed on protein. Firearm collections should be monitored for evidence of borings, larva castings, and gnaw marks. Regular cleaning of the firearm and display area will help to prevent a pest infestation.

=== Pollutants ===
Pollutants are environmental agents, chemical or physical, that can alter the aesthetic appearance or damage objects Dust, composed of dirt, fibers, skin cells, and pollen, is a common pollutant, but if not removed can lead to damage. On historic firearms, dust will absorb moisture, attract pests, and abrade the surface. Regular cleaning will reduce the build-up of dust and other particulate matter. Other pollutants will react chemically with the object, potentially causing permanent damage. Improper storage or display materials can react to the metal components and cause corrosion. One material that should not be stored with firearms is leather which will corrode the metal as it off-gases. Storage and display materials can be tested using the Oddy Test to determine if they will react to the firearm's components.

=== Disassociation ===
Disassociation is the loss of data, objects, or association between objects It can occur when documentation is lost, objects or their parts are damaged or removed and lost. With historic firearms, disassociation can happen when the weapon is disassembled for cleaning or the firing pins are removed to deter theft or accidental firing. Without proper labeling and tracking, the parts may be lost. Serial numbers and maker's marks can be removed if the firearm is cleaned with abrasive chemicals. To prevent disassociation, all components should be labeled, serial numbers noted, and if the part is removed its location should be recorded. When cleaning the firearm, appropriate cleaning agents and waxes should be used to prevent the loss of historical data.

=== Thieves and Vandals ===
In the United States, historic firearms do not need to be registered and are a popular collector's item, making them potential targets for theft. To deter theft museums may decide to remove the firing pin, thus making the gun inoperable and less desirable to thieves. When on display, firearms should be kept in cases made of acrylic, polycarbonate, or safety glass, and they should be locked or screwed shut. In storage areas firearms should also be locked in a secure area or in metal drawer units and, there should be a minimal number of keys available to unlock display or storage cases The keys also should not be easily replicated. If the firearms are used for research, researchers should be monitored by staff and not be allowed coats or backpacks in the research area because some historic firearms are quite small and could easily fit in a coat pocket.

== Handling ==
Proper handling is important to preventing damage to historic firearms. Gloves, either nitrile or white cotton, should be worn every time the firearm is handled as the natural oils, salts, and acids from skin can cause corrosion on the metal surfaces Longarms should not be carried by the wrist of the stock and should instead be kept in front of the body and supported by both hands. As a safety precaution, firearms should be checked to make sure they are not loaded. For breech-loading firearms, after opening the action, a light should be shined down the barrel or a small mirror used to look at the breech to see if the barrel is blocked. A conservator should be contacted if the barrel is blocked and the cartridge cannot be easily removed. To check muzzle-loading firearms, a cleaning rod is inserted down the barrel and marked, the rod is then removed and aligned with the muzzle. If the difference between where the rod is marked and the touch hole is greater than 1.5 in (38 mm), the barrel is most likely loaded and a conservator should be consulted.

== Storage ==
Historic firearms should be stored away from pollutants such as wool or silk which contain sulfur and leather, each of which will corrode metal as it off-gases. Small firearms and long arms can be stored in acid-free boxes and should be supported or cushioned with polyethylene foam or acid free tissue. Long arms can also be stored in boxes and supported like small firearms. If, however; the longarms cannot be stored in boxes, they should be stored vertically with barrels down and padded with polyethlene foam. The firearms should be stored with the locks upright.

== Environment ==
The environment in which historic objects are held greatly impacts their overall long-term health. For historic firearms it is important to recognize that because of their composite nature, each material will respond differently to environmental stresses which can in turn affect adjacent surfaces. Generally, the acceptable environmental controls of historic firearms are a relative humidity between 35 and 50% and a temperature below 72°. Although their tolerances may vary, UV and infrared light will damage the materials of historic firearms and should be monitored.

== Treatment ==
The conservation of historic firearms requires knowledge of the care and treatment of organic and inorganic materials. Treatment can range from simple cleaning to conservation-restoration and return to firing capabilities. Prior to treatment, three factors should be considered: has the source of the damage been eliminated, what is the extent of the damage, and what are the long-term effects of the treatment. General guidelines for conservation treatment of any object is to make sure the treatment is reversible, treatments and materials should be chemically and physically compatible, and the treatment must use stable chemicals that will not off-gas or react with the object creating further deterioration. Other than general cleaning as part of a museum's housekeeping routine, treatment should be performed by a conservator.

=== Cleaning ===
Cleaning historic firearms begins with an examination of its condition to ensure it can withstand the cleaning procedure. A partial disassembly may be necessary; however, it is not recommended for matchlocks and wheellocks as their screws and pins are not easily removed. Loose dust and dirt can be removed with a soft brush, such as a hake brush, and the debris directed toward a vacuum nozzle. Commercial cleaning products and varnishes, and brass and silver polishes should be avoided as these items may damage the firearm. Sometimes conservation grade waxes, like Renaissance wax, are used to improve the firearm's appearance and guard against dust.

=== Conservation-Restoration ===
Conservation-restoration work on historic firearms is a series of procedures designed to stabilize, repair or restore parts, and stop deterioration. Stabilizing a firearm means establishing the ideal environment conditions, removing corrosion, replacing missing components, and repairing broken parts. For example, if the wrist of a long arm is cracked, a conservator would repair the breakage which would stabilize the firearm, enabling its use for display or research. The goal of restoration work may be returning the firearm to original form, returning all the mechanical components to working order, or returning it to firing capabilities. Conservation-restoration of historic firearms requires the skilled work of a conservator.
