= Channel letter =

Internally illuminated three-dimensional letters for signage

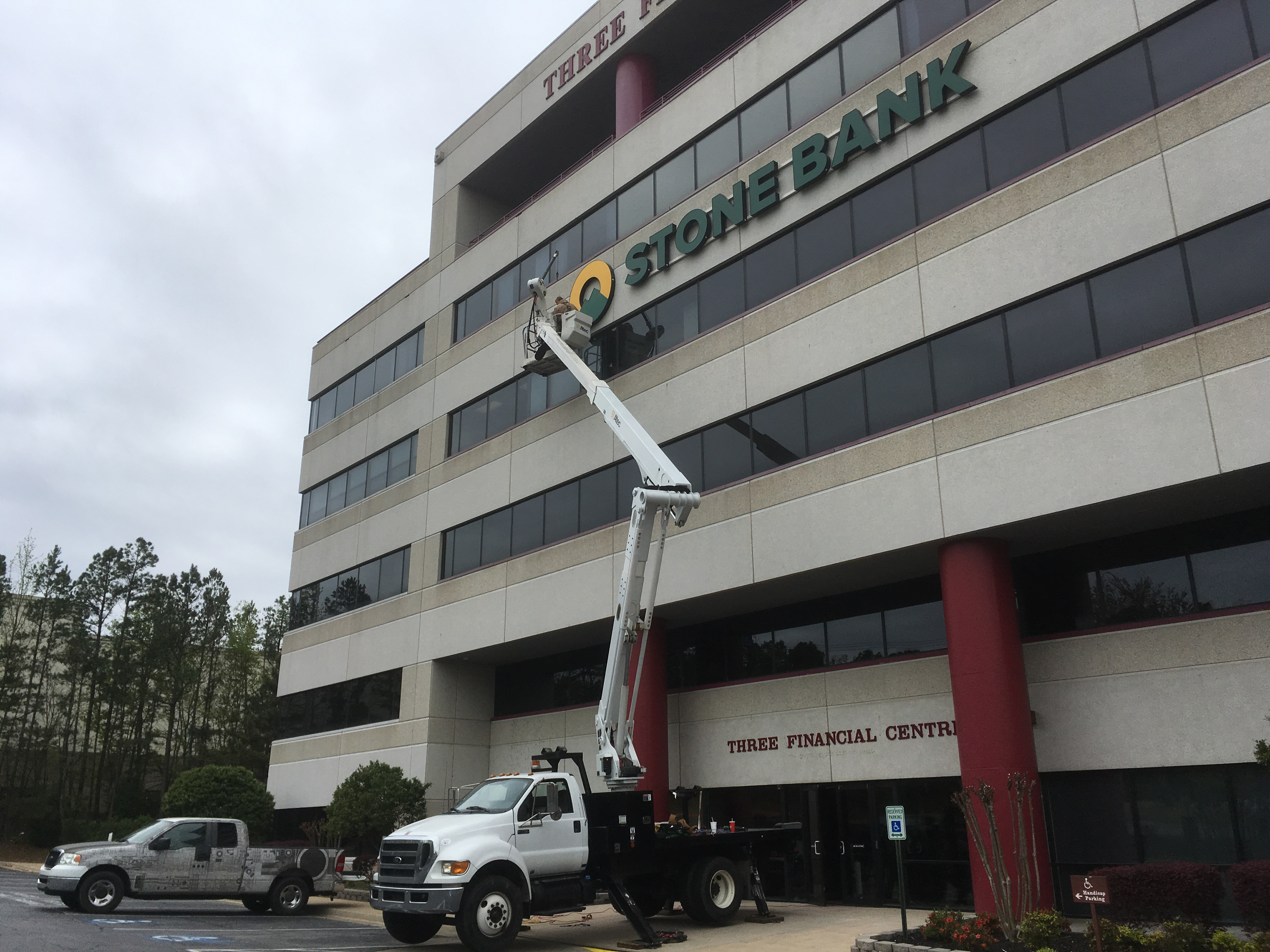
A set of standard channel letters being installed with a bucket truck

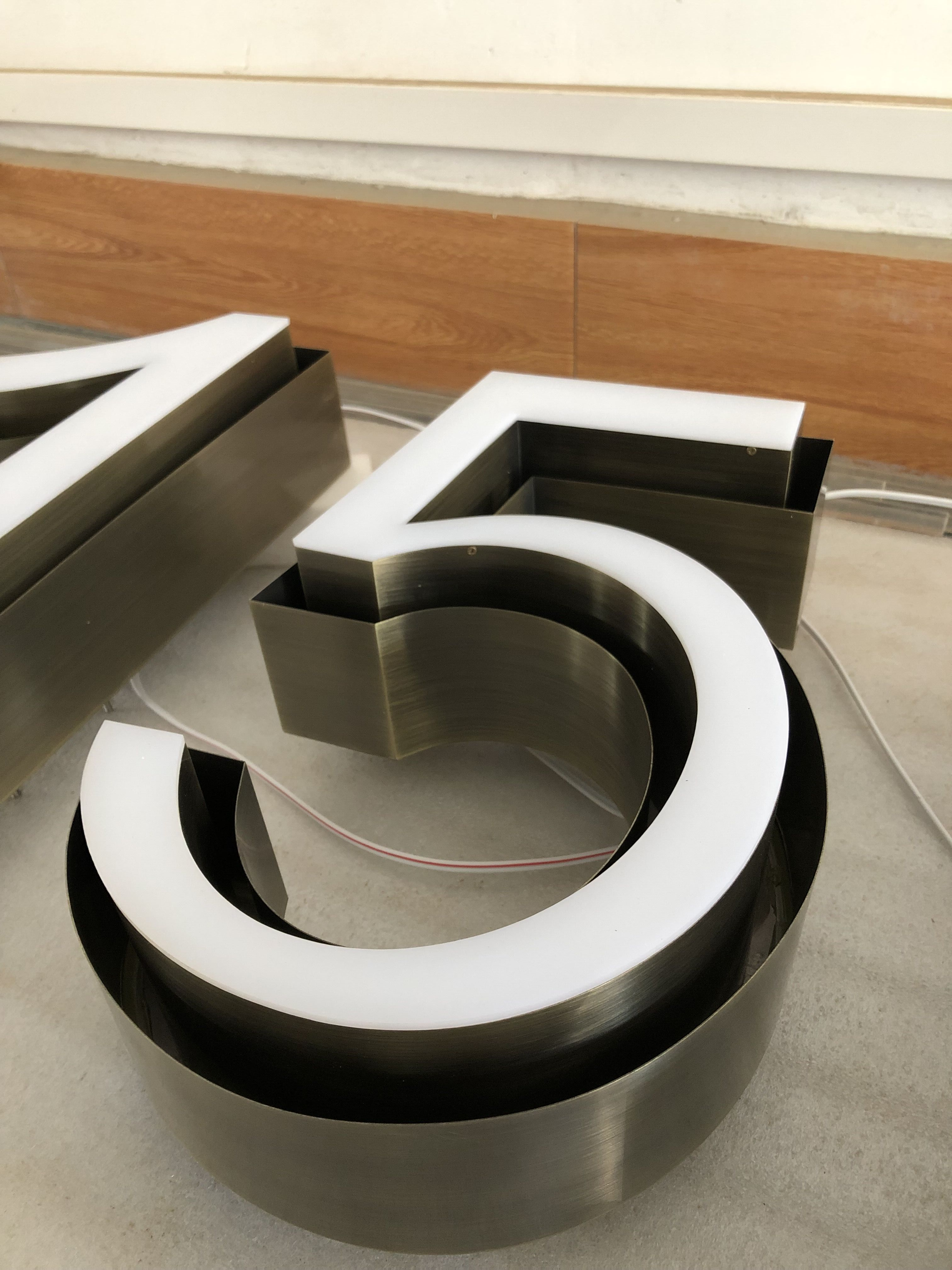
Channel letters

Channel letters are custom-made metal or plastic letters commonly used in exterior signage on public and commercial buildings, and often internally illuminated. Unlit three dimensional letters that are applied to sign panels or monuments are usually referred to as dimensional letters.

== Channel letter types ==
=== Face-lit channel letters ===
==== Metal construction (standard) ====
A standard channel letter is a three-dimensional graphic sign element. Its channel is fabricated from sheet metal, most often aluminum since it will not rust. A flat sheet of aluminum is typically cut on a table by a computer-controlled router, laser, or water jet, based on a vector-based art file (.cdr, .eps, .ai, .scv, .sci, or .fs). This creates the back of the channel and is the basis for the letter shape. The sides of the channel letter, called the returns, are then formed by bending a 3–6 in-wide (80–150 mm) strip of aluminum sheet around the aluminum back. This return can be welded at the seam or flanged and riveted or, with a metal stitcher, can be fastened with galvanized or stainless wire to the back to create a solid can in the shape of the letter. The letter can is painted and fitted with any lighting components necessary such as neon gas tubes or light-emitting diode (LED) modules. A translucent plastic face usually of 3/16 in (5 mm) thick sheet acrylic fiber or polycarbonate is cut to fit the open face of the letter can. A trim cap border is applied to its edges which gives the letter face a finished appearance and creates a fastening surface to attach it to the letter can. When illuminated at night, channel letters draw the eye of passers-by.

The face can also be applied with black perforated vinyl, so the letters appear black in the daytime and white when lit at night. For the best effect, face colors are usually matched with their closest corresponding LED color. A warm white LED is best used with a yellow or orange face. Since the advent of LED lighting technology, channel letters have become thinner in depth, decreasing to as shallow as 2–3 in (50–80 mm) from 5–6 in (130–150 mm), a trend which began in Europe, and is seen increasingly in the United States.

==== Exposed neon channel letters ====
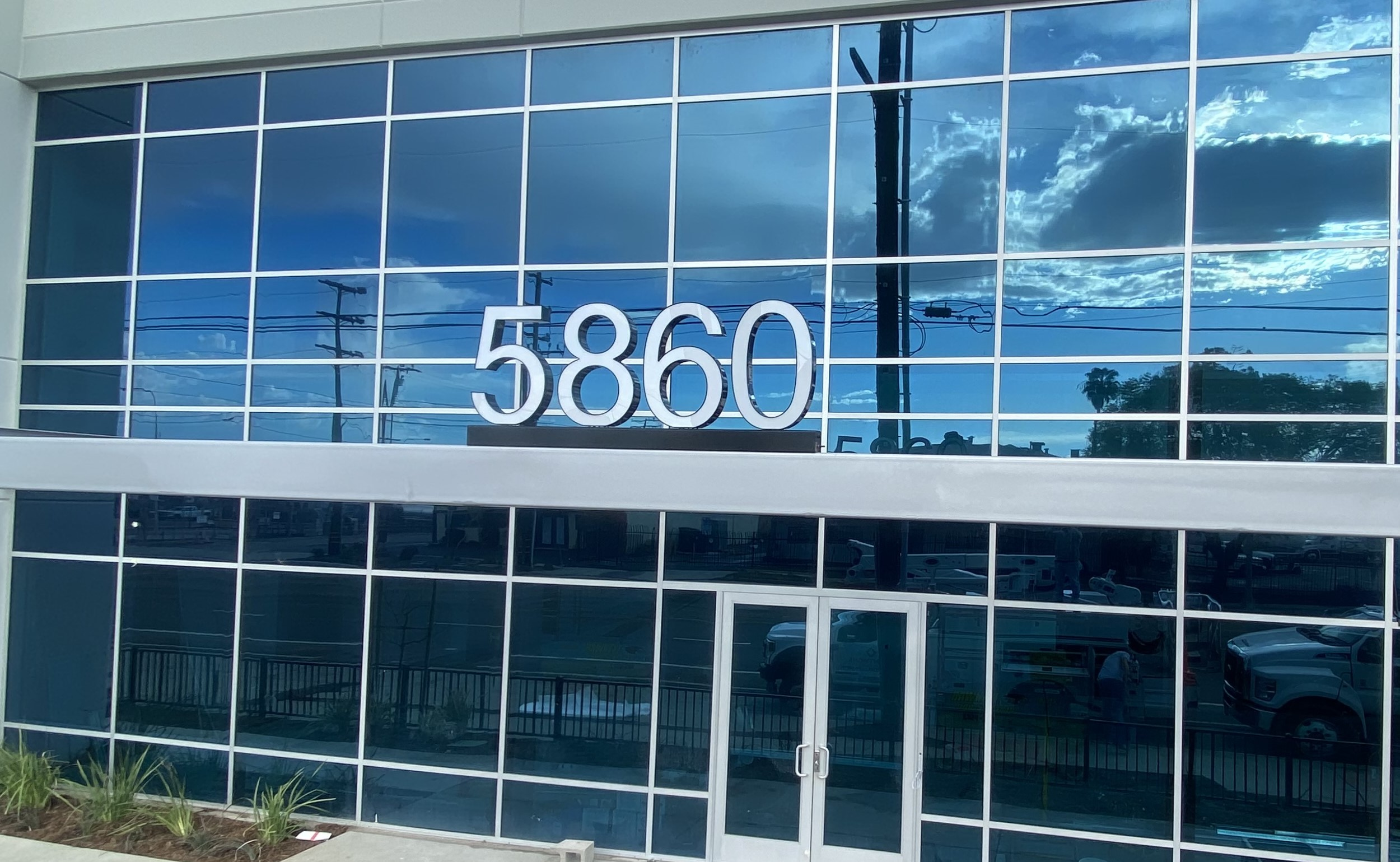
Address number channel letters mounted on the building's face

These are standard channel letters, but the neon is covered with a clear acrylic face to keep birds from making a nest as well as to protect the exposed neon from outside elements, i.e., weather, etc. This allows for the exposed neon to be seen, as well as the inside of the channel letter interior itself to add to the dimensional look.

==== Plastic formed channel letters ====
Formed channel letters feature a molded plastic backer with a raised lip. A plastic molded cover snaps over the base. The cover, or face, can be flat, round or "prismatic" (faceted face) and is made from translucent light-diffusing colored plastic. Light is emitted from both the face and the sides of the letter. Cut vinyl can also be applied to the face to create various colored light effects, or to produce a halo effect. The plastic face can also be made with a translucent chrome finish so the letters appear chrome by day, but still light up at night.

=== Back-lit channel letters ===
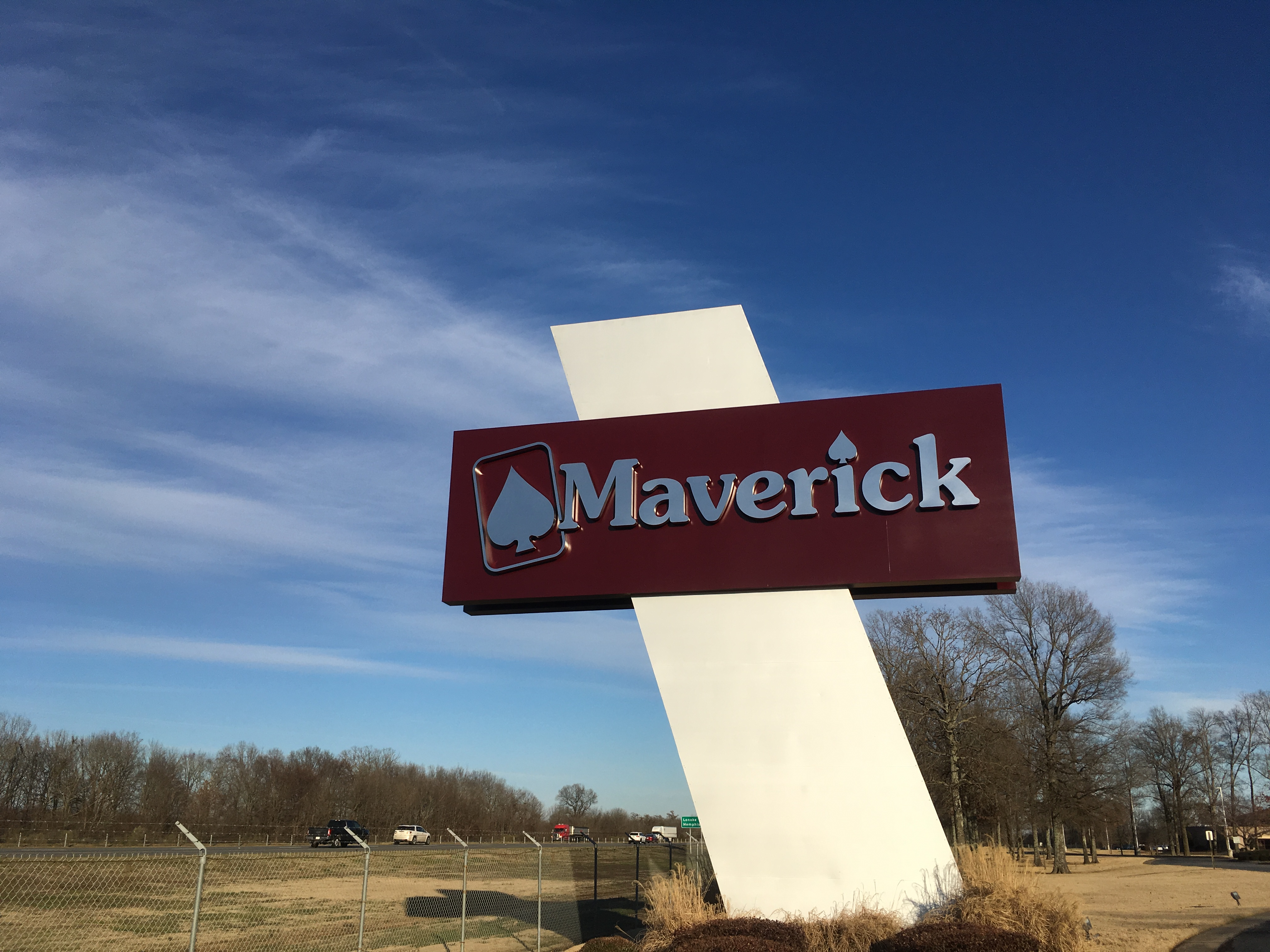
A set of reverse channel letters on a pole sign

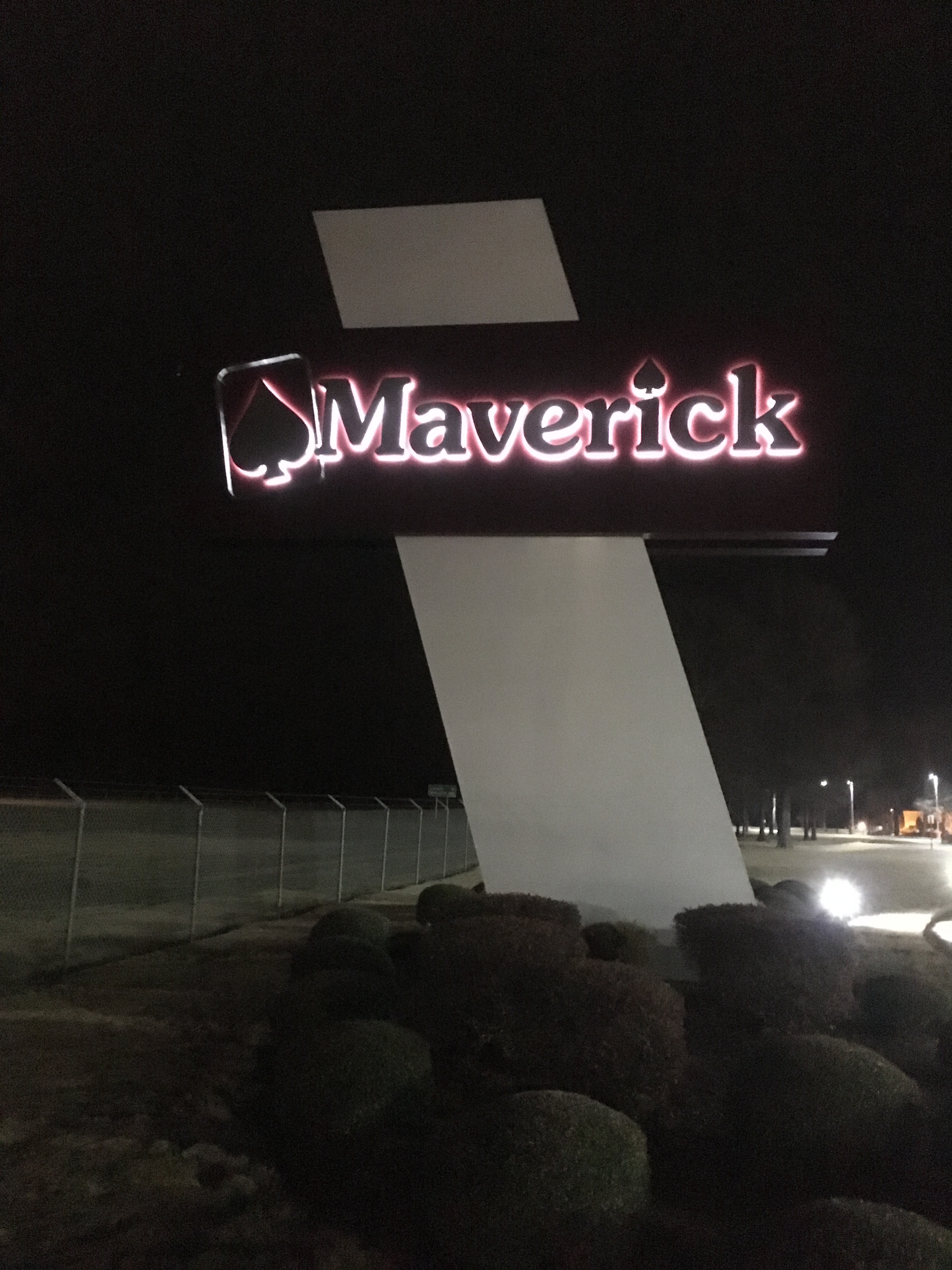
A set of reverse channel letters illuminated at night, showing the halo illumination of the background

Back-lit channel letters are also called "reverse-lit" or "halo letters." The face of the letter is constructed from aluminum and the lighting is directed to the back. This light floods the wall that the letter is mounted to and creates a negative space at night. It is usually the most expensive form to manufacture. LEDs are installed to the inside back of the can, and the back is often fitted with a clear or translucent plastic back to diffuse the light and protect the lighting elements and wiring. The letters are typically mounted 1-1/2" from the wall so they are set off from the façade of the building. The inside of the can is often painted white to reflect light. The effect of the halo lighting allows for a variety of creative effects depending on the color, sheen, and texture of the building surface. Light-colored building surfaces with a matte finish produce the best halo effect; dark mirror-like finishes the worst.

=== Face- and back-lit channel letters ===
These letters combine the features of a face and back-lit letter. The inside of the can is usually not painted white.

== Mounting ==
Channel letters may be flush mounted (attached directly to the building facade), or they may be mounted on a raceway or wireway. A raceway is a rectangular mounting structure which serves as both a container for the sign's electrical components (such as a power supply) and a mounting structure.

A wireway also serves as a mounting structure but typically contains only wiring. It is thinner and broader than a raceway, and may also be used as a backer panel for the channel letter set.

Face-lit letters may also be mounted so they rest on the top the building surface with a bottom and top rail supported by metal arms.
