= Bulk foods =

Food items sold in large quantities

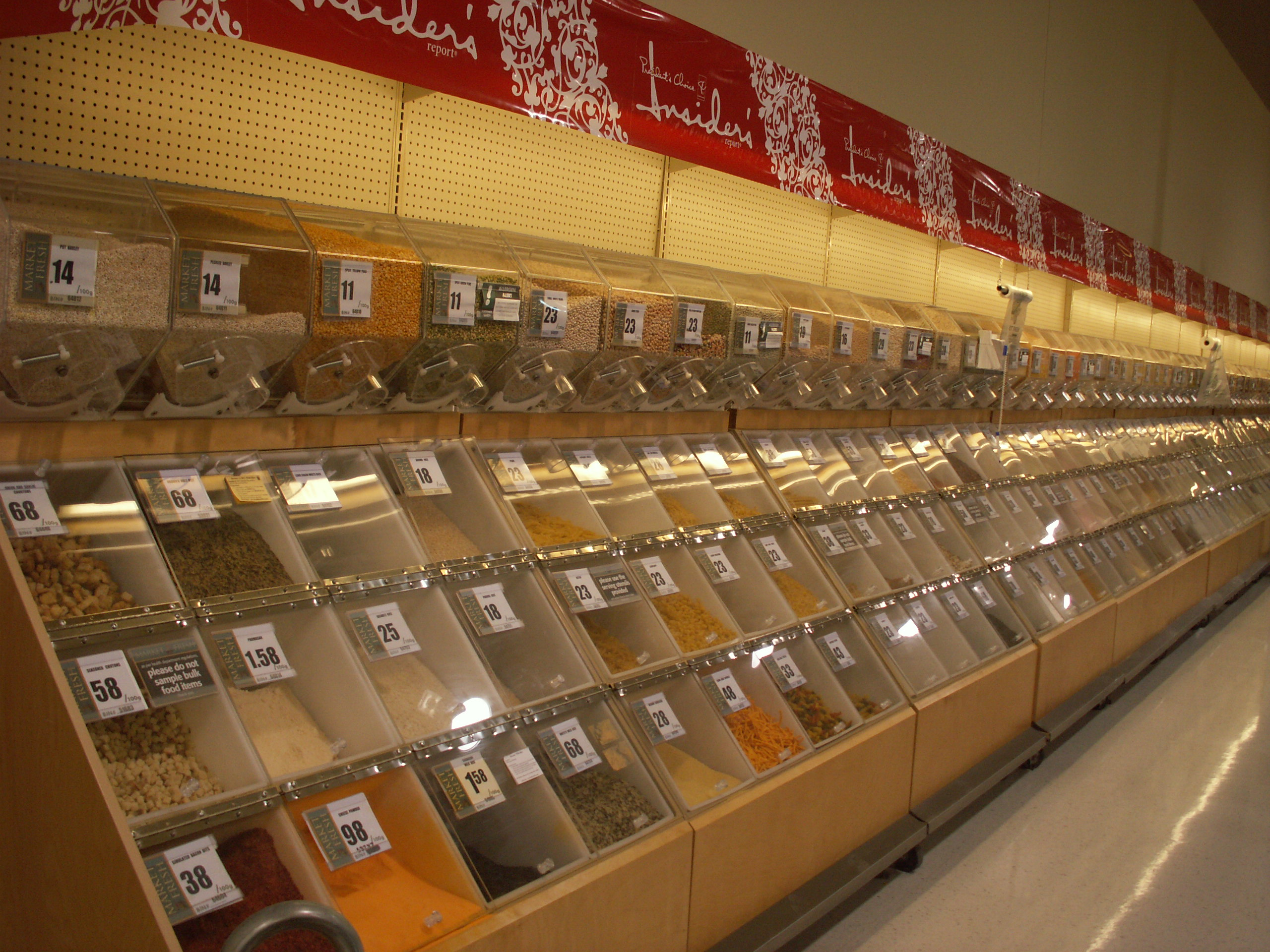
Bulk foods at the Real Canadian Superstore in Winkler, Manitoba

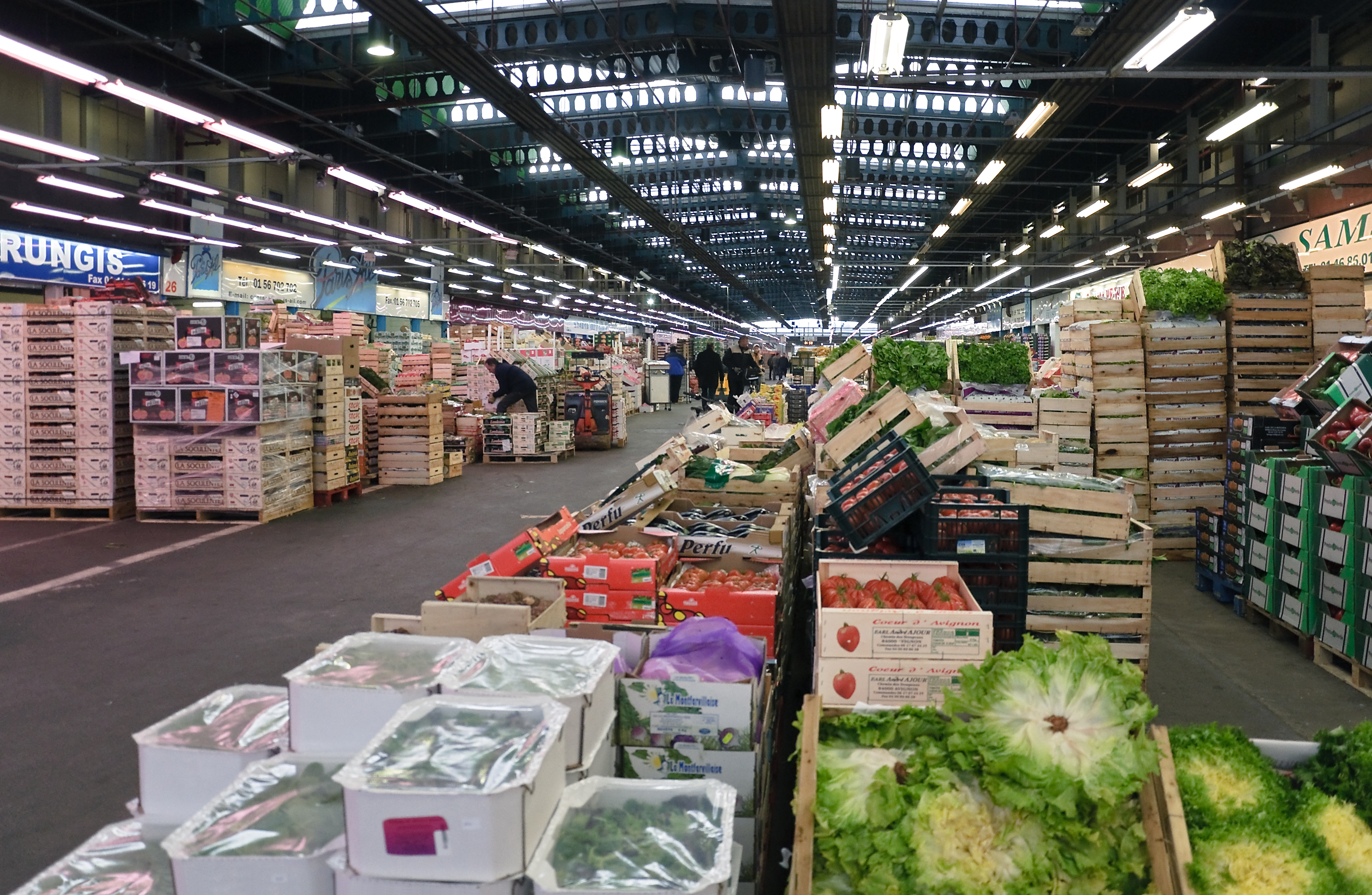
The Rungis International Market in France offers wholesale bulk foods.

Bulk foods are food items offered in large quantities, which can be purchased in large, bulk lots or transferred from a bulk container into a smaller container for purchase. Bulk foods may be priced less compared to packaged foods because they are typically packaged in large generic bulk containers and packaging for grocery outlets, which utilizes lesser natural resources. Additionally, less packaging is congruent with the environmental conservation of natural resources and sustainability. One study found a 96% reduction in packaging used for bulk foods compared to packaged foods.

== National Bulk Foods Week ==
A National Bulk Foods Week was designated between October 16–22, 2011 in ten U.S. states.

== Products ==
Some commonly available bulk foods and products include:

Dry goods

- Beans
- Candy
  - Licorice
- Cereals
- Coffee
- Cookies
- Cornmeal
- Dehydrated potatoes
- Dried fruits
  - Dates
  - Dried kiwifruit
- Grains
  - Bulgur
  - Flour
  - Oats
  - Pancake mix
  - Pasta
    - Dry Noodles
  - Popcorn
  - Rice
  - Whole grains
- Granola
- Herbs
- Nuts
- Peanuts
- Pet food
- Pretzels
- Salt
- Seasonings
- Spices
  - Crystallized ginger
- Sugar
- Tea
- Trail mix

Liquid and wet goods

- Honey
- Cooking oils
- Fruit spreads
- Olive oil
- Maple syrup
- Molasses
- Peanut butter
- Vinegar

Household goods

- Dish detergent
- Laundry detergent

== Retailers ==
Notable retailers of bulk foods include:

- Cub Foods
- Colruyt
- Costco
- Food 4 Less
- Bulk Barn
- Giant Eagle
- Lunds
- Real Canadian Superstore
- Roundy's
- Rungis International Market
- Sam's Club
- Sprouts Farmers Market
- Whole Foods Market
- WinCo Foods

== See also ==
- Grocers – originally sold dry goods out of bins and barrels
- Grocery store
