= Porcelanosa =

Spanish manufacturer, distributor and retailer of ceramic tiles

Porcelanosa Grupo
- Company type: Private
- Founded: 1973
- Founder: Pepe Soriano
- Headquarters: Villarreal, Spain
- Area served: 143 countries
- Key people: Manuel Colonques
- Products: Ceramic, porcelain fittings, wall tiles, floor tiles, wood parquet, hardwood, natural stone, mosaics, kitchens, etc.
- Website: www.porcelanosa.com

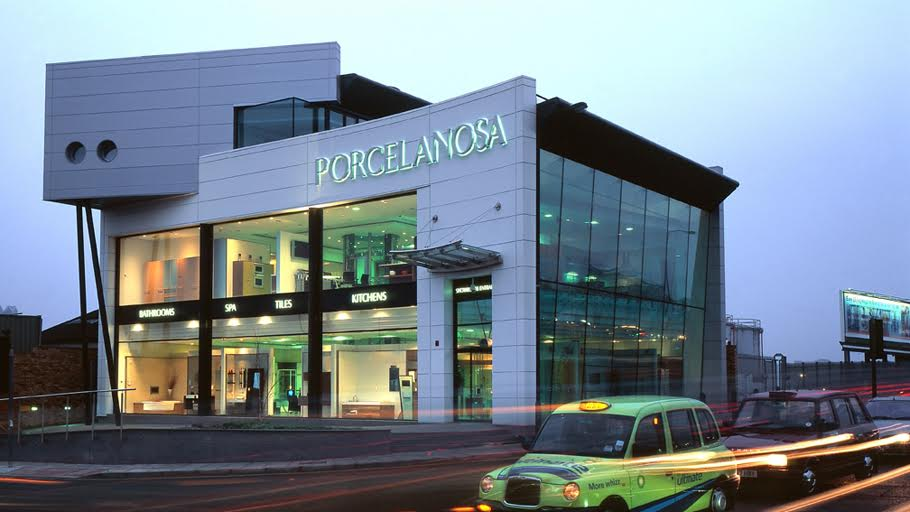
Porcelanosa in Fulham in London.

Porcelanosa Group is a Spanish manufacturer, distributor and retailer of ceramic tiles. Products include ceramic, porcelain fittings, wall tiles, floor tiles, wood parquet, hardwood, natural stone, mosaics, kitchens, sanitary ware, brassware, bathtubs, shower trays, hydro massage cabins and columns, bathrooms, accessories, and bedroom furniture.

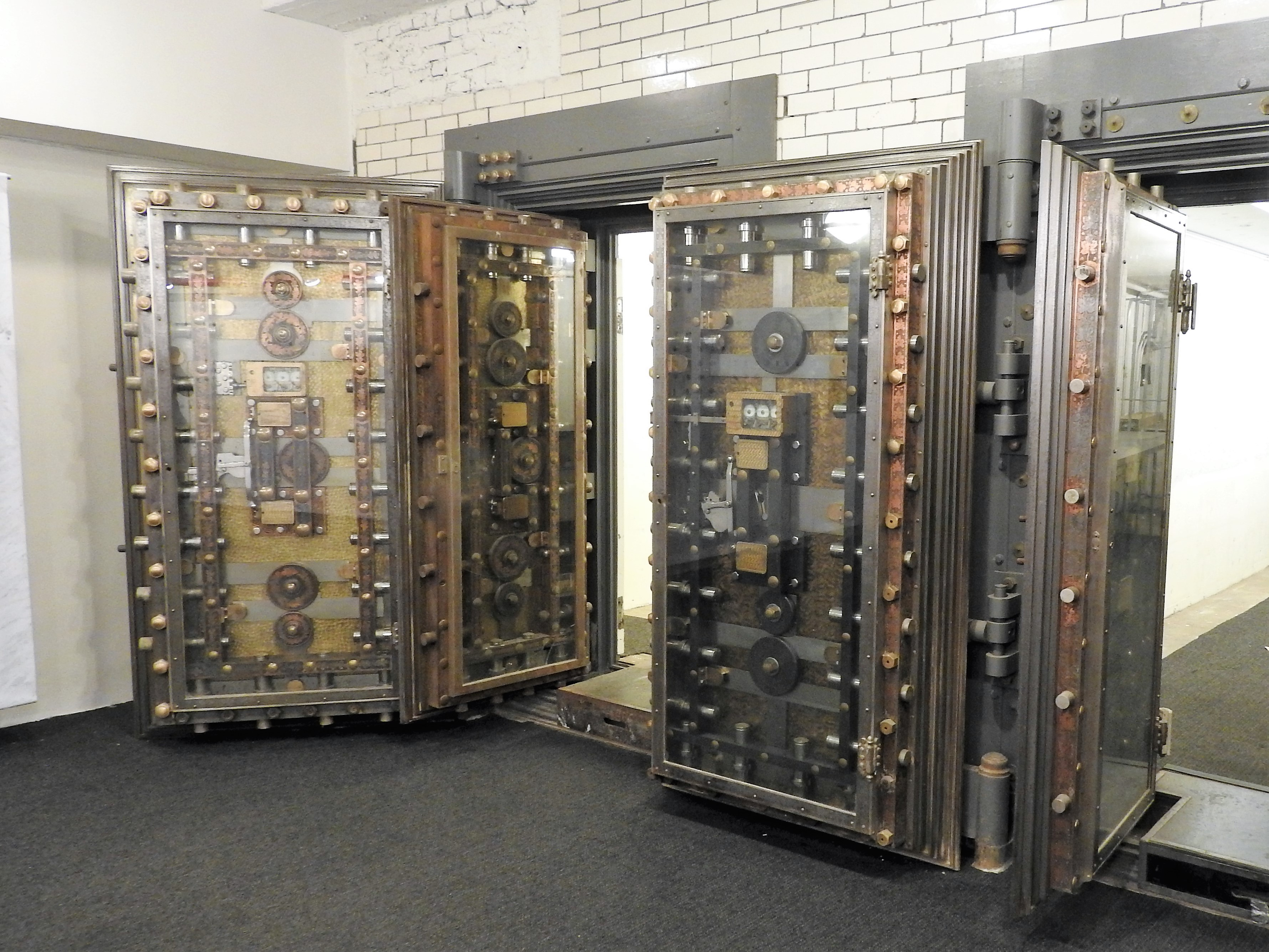
Bank vault in New York City office of Porcelanosa

== Companies ==
Porcelanosa Group is made up of eight subsidiary companies:

- Porcelanosa, created in 1973 and focused on ceramic flooring and wall tiles.
- Venis, 1986, focuses on the production of floorings and wall tiles.
- Gamadecor, 1987: Kitchen, bathroom furniture, accessories and wardrobes.
- Krion, 1993, a solid surface material used for countertops and facades.
- L’Antic Colonial, 1999, focuses on "natural products" such as stone, marble, ceramics, mosaics and wood.
- Butech, 2001, focuses on tiling, construction materials and systems. Provides building systems like facades, mortars and special adhesives for extreme weather conditions.
- Noken, 2001, focuses on sanitaryware, taps and faucets, bathtubs and showers, bathroom furniture and accessories.
- Urbatek, 2004, focused on architecture and design projects and provides ceramics suitable for both exterior and interior applications.
