= Central vacuum cleaner =

Type of vacuum cleaner appliance

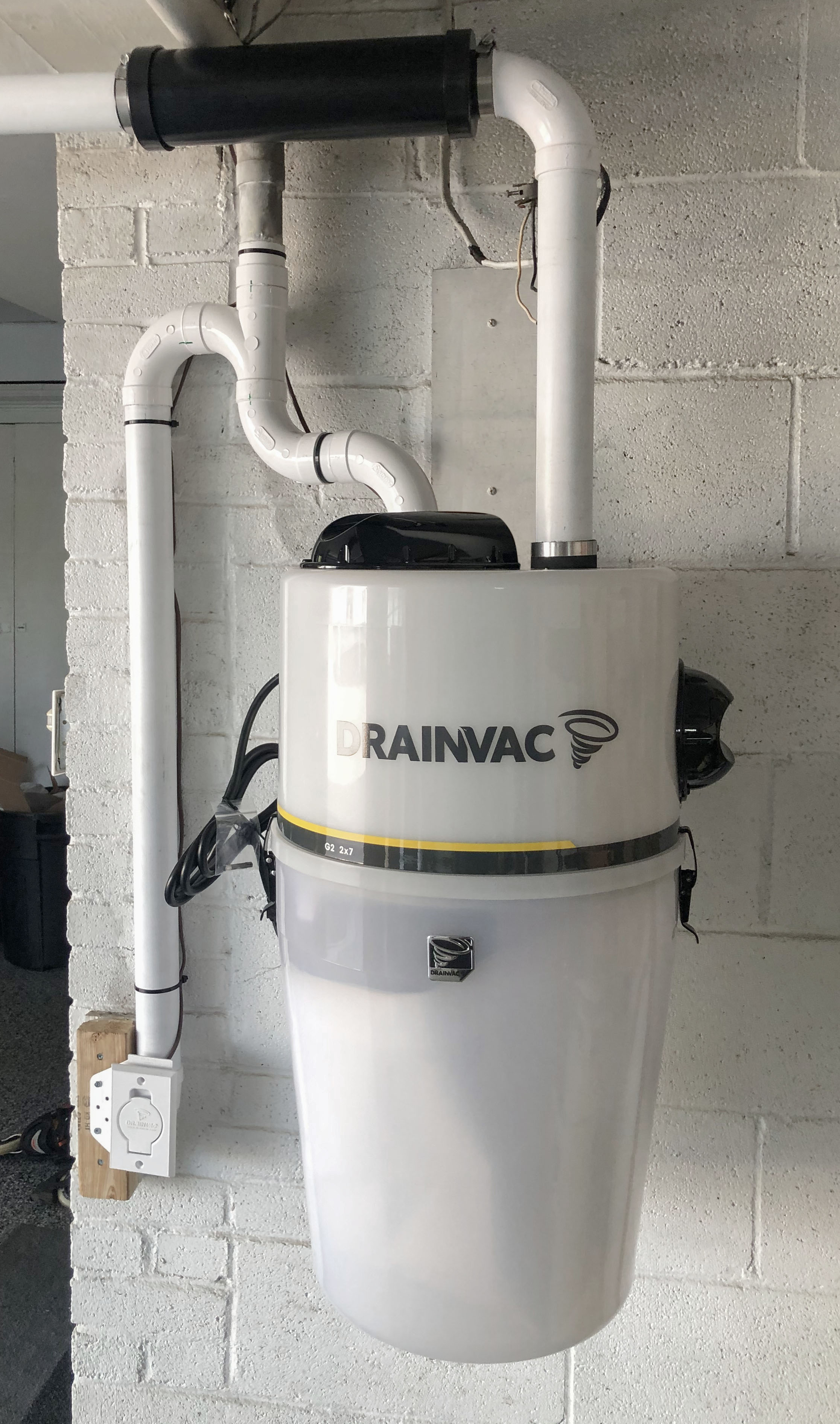
Central vacuum, with an air inlet to the left

A central vacuum cleaner (also known as built-in or ducted) is a type of vacuum cleaner appliance installed into a building as a semi-permanent fixture. Central vacuum systems are designed to remove dirt and debris from homes and buildings by sending dirt particles through piping installed inside the walls to a collection container inside a remote utility space. The power unit is a permanent fixture, usually installed in a basement, garage, or storage room, along with the collection container. Inlets are installed in walls throughout the building that attach to power hoses and other central vacuum accessories to remove dust, particles, and small debris from interior rooms. Most power hoses have a power switch located on the handle.

== History ==
=== 19th century ===
Early steam-powered vacuum cleaners were mounted in a heavy carriage equipped with a long hose so they could be moved from one location to another, providing a specialized cleaning service by appointment. Stationary-powered vacuum cleaners were built-in and centralized, due to the large and heavy machinery needed to produce the required airflow. Their high cost restricted their installation to commercial and industrial locations.

The first introduction of a permanent system similar to a residential central vacuum cleaner was in the late 19th century. A ducted machine featuring copper tubes connected from a bellows chamber, typically located in the basement and extended to several locations throughout a building, was used in a select few homes. Because of the machine's cost and weak dust-removal capabilities, only a few units were ever sold in the United States.

In 1869, Ives McGaffey patented the first portable vacuum cleaner, or sweeping machine. Steam power was replaced by electric motors, which were still too large and heavy for portable use, but gradually became smaller and more powerful.

=== 20th century ===
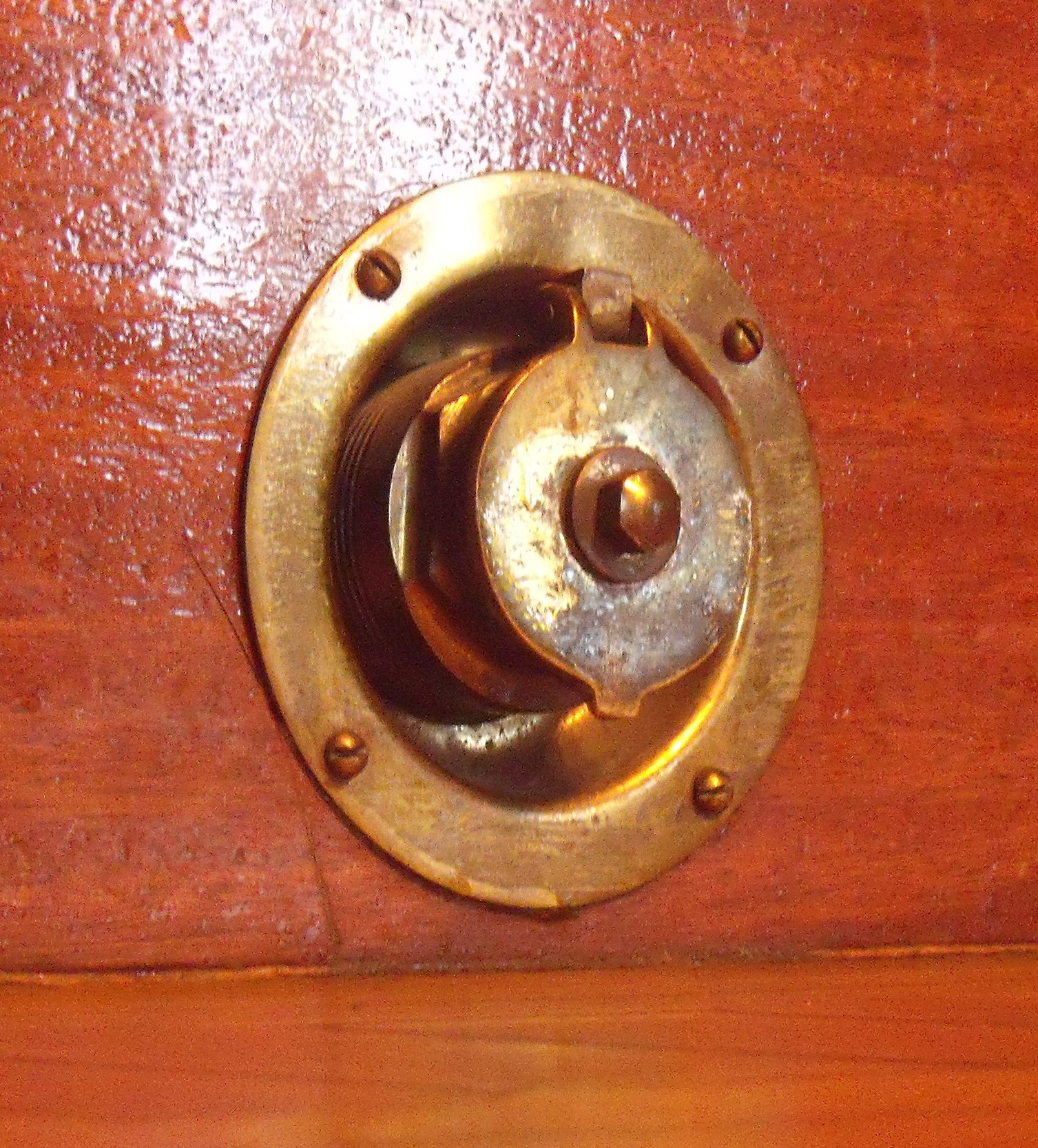
Antique central vacuum inlet located in a dining room at Château Dufresne (Canadian Register of Historic Places, c. 1918)

By the 1930s, the development of small, powerful electric motors increased the popularity and availability of the portable vacuum cleaner, and diverted consumers from purchasing central cleaners.

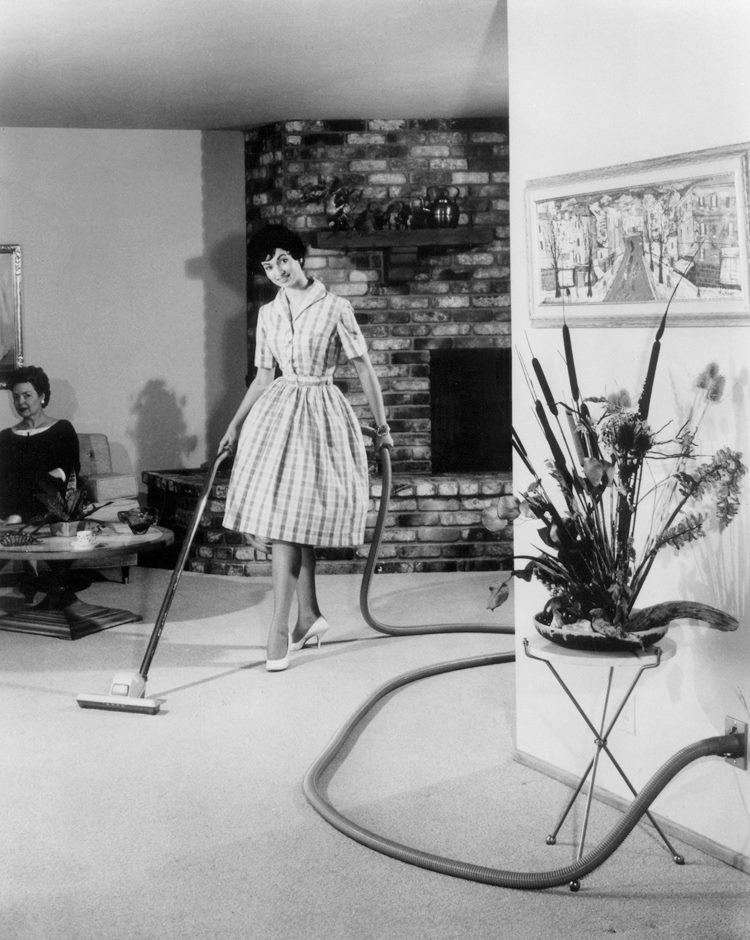
A 1950s-era photo promoting the convenience of a central vacuum (Netherlands)

By the early 1960s, the introduction of polyvinyl chloride (PVC) made a central vacuum system more affordable and popular in North America (especially Canada), by using PVC extruded pipe instead of metal tubing for the piping system inside the walls. Previously, more expensive metal tubing was used exclusively (and it may still be used for part or all of an installation, if required by building fire code regulations).

== Power ==
The suction power of a vacuum cleaner is measured in airwatts (or air watts). This is not to be confused with motor input power in watts. The airwatt value relates to the airflow, the water lift, and power consumption. This datum is calculated as follows: P = 1/8.5 x F x S where P translates to the power in air watts; F is the airflow in CFM; and S for the water lift in inches. The standard air watt formula is from ASTM International (see document ASTM F558-21).

Nowadays, the power of single-motor central vacuums is usually between 500 and 800 airwatts. For central vacuums that operate with two motors, the best practice for representing the vacuum cleaner power is to prefix "2 X" in front of the power for one motor. For instance, if a central vacuum has two motors with a power of 500 airwatts each, the whole central vacuum has 2 X 500 airwatts. Airwatts cannot be added together; a unit with two motors of 500 airwatts each does not make a 1000-airwatt unit.

For central vacuums with two motors, the airflow may be connected in series or in parallel (not to be confused with the electrical connections, which are always in parallel). When two motorized blowers are connected in series, both motors work together so that the air outlet of the first one is the air inlet of the second one. This configuration gives more water lift (measured in inches or millimeters). Water lift measures the maximum suction force ("pressure") of the device when the hose opening is blocked. The higher the value, the heavier the objects or dense materials which can be easily vacuumed. A high suction force is usually required for deep carpet cleaning or vacuuming liquids.

== Operation ==
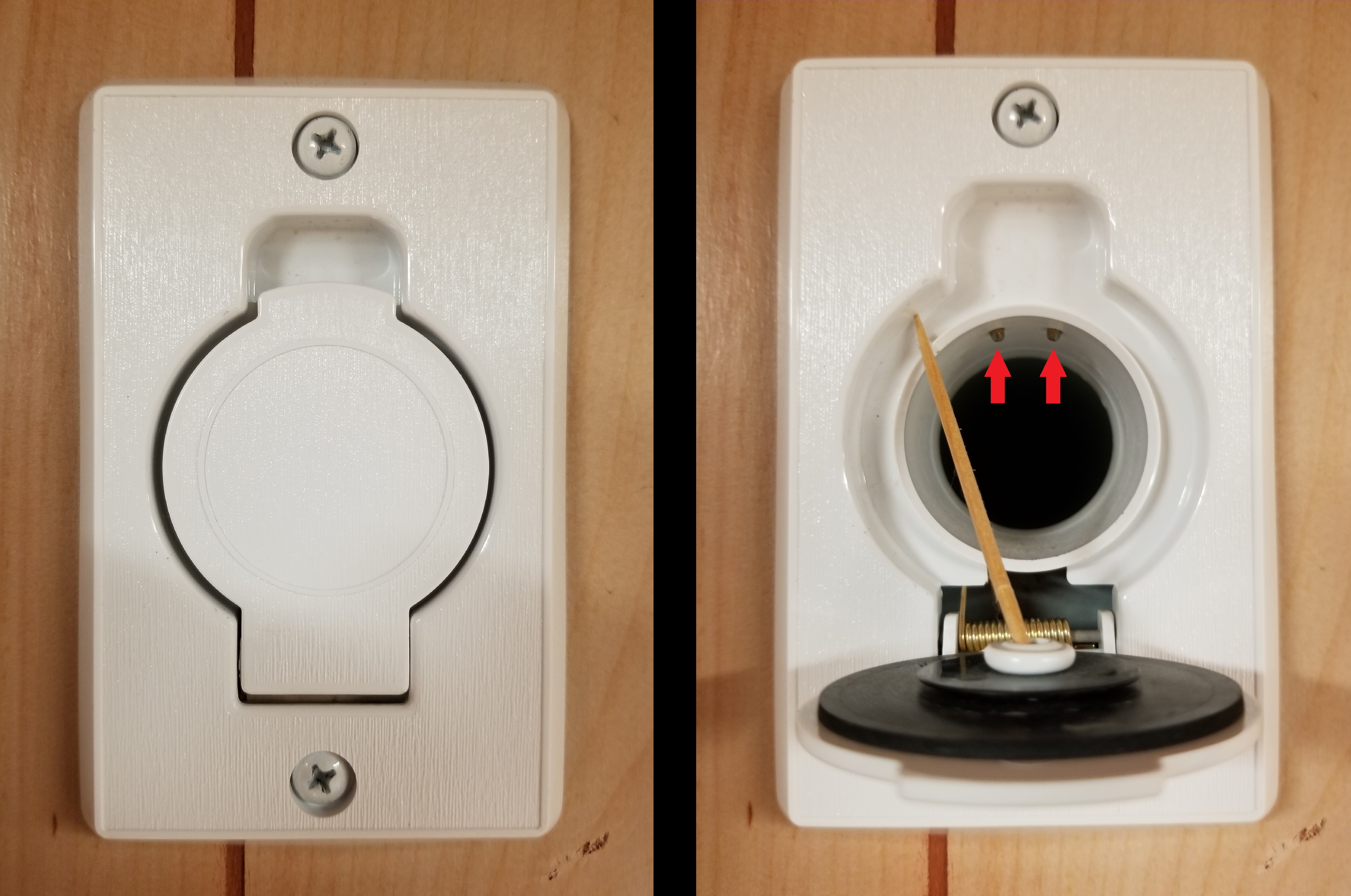
When a hose is inserted into an inlet, or the switch on a hose is turned on, two low-voltage electrical contacts (red arrows) are bridged, signalling the power unit to turn on

To use a central vacuum, the vacuum hose is removed from storage and fitted with any needed cleaning accessories (such as a brush). The other end of the hose is inserted into a wall-mounted vacuum inlet, after opening the spring-loaded cover door. In some designs, opening the door switches on the vacuum motor; in other designs, insertion of the metallic hose-end fitting bridges two electrical contacts, signalling the motor to turn on. Other alternative designs feature a remote on/off switch located at the tool end of the vacuum hose, which communicates either via a pair of wires embedded in the hose or via wireless signalling.

Vacuuming is performed in the same manner as with a portable machine. Sometimes, the higher suction power of the central vacuum may require reduction (for example, when cleaning a delicate sheer fabric curtain). Excess suction is "bled off" by partially opening a bleed port or slot to let some intake air bypass the cleaning tool. The bleed port is usually located at the tool end of the vacuum hose, to allow quick adjustment during use.

When cleaning is complete, the vacuum hose is removed from the wall inlet (which snaps shut and shuts down the vacuum motor). The hose is coiled up and hung on a storage rack, and any cleaning accessories are stowed away.

== Dirt separation ==
Cyclonic and filtered central vacuum systems are the two main types of central vacuums, differentiated by the method used to separate dirt and dust from the incoming airstream.

True cyclonic cleaners do not use filtration bags, instead separating the dirt and dust into a detachable cylindrical collection vessel or bin. Air and dust are sucked at high speed into the collection vessel at a direction tangential to the vessel wall, creating a fast-spinning vortex. Roughly speaking, the dust particles and other debris spiral outward to the wall of the vessel by centrifugal force, where they fall due to gravity into the bottom of the collection bin.

In fixed-installation central vacuum cleaners, the cleaned air may be exhausted directly outside without the need for further filtration. A well-designed cyclonic separation system does not lose suction power due to airflow restriction until the collection vessel is almost full. This is in marked contrast to filter bag systems, which gradually lose suction as pores in the filter become clogged by collected dirt and dust.

Filtered systems use a wide variety of different bags or filters that must be cleaned (permanent cloth bags) or replaced (disposable paper bags) regularly. Filters can be made from screening, foam, paper, or cloth, and are usually proprietary designs that may not be widely available. Over time, repeated purchases of filters and bags can become significant ongoing expenses.

Motors of both filtered and filterless systems are usually protected by a thermal cutoff switch, which disconnects the power if the motor overheats due to blocked airflow. In addition, the best designs in either system incorporate so-called "bypass cooling", using a completely separate source of ambient air to cool the motor, rather than the cost-saving expedient of using the just-filtered dirty airflow for this vital function.

Hybrid cyclonic filtered systems have been made, which use a rudimentary cyclonic motion to separate larger dirt particles but rely on conventional filter bags to trap the remaining finer particles. True cyclonic systems are very effective in removing all but the finest particles, which are then exhausted directly outside, eliminating the need for replaceable filters and their consequent airflow restrictions. The exhaust from a good quality true cyclonic system does not contain any visible large particles, and contains far less debris than a typical clothes dryer exhaust.

== Tools and accessories ==
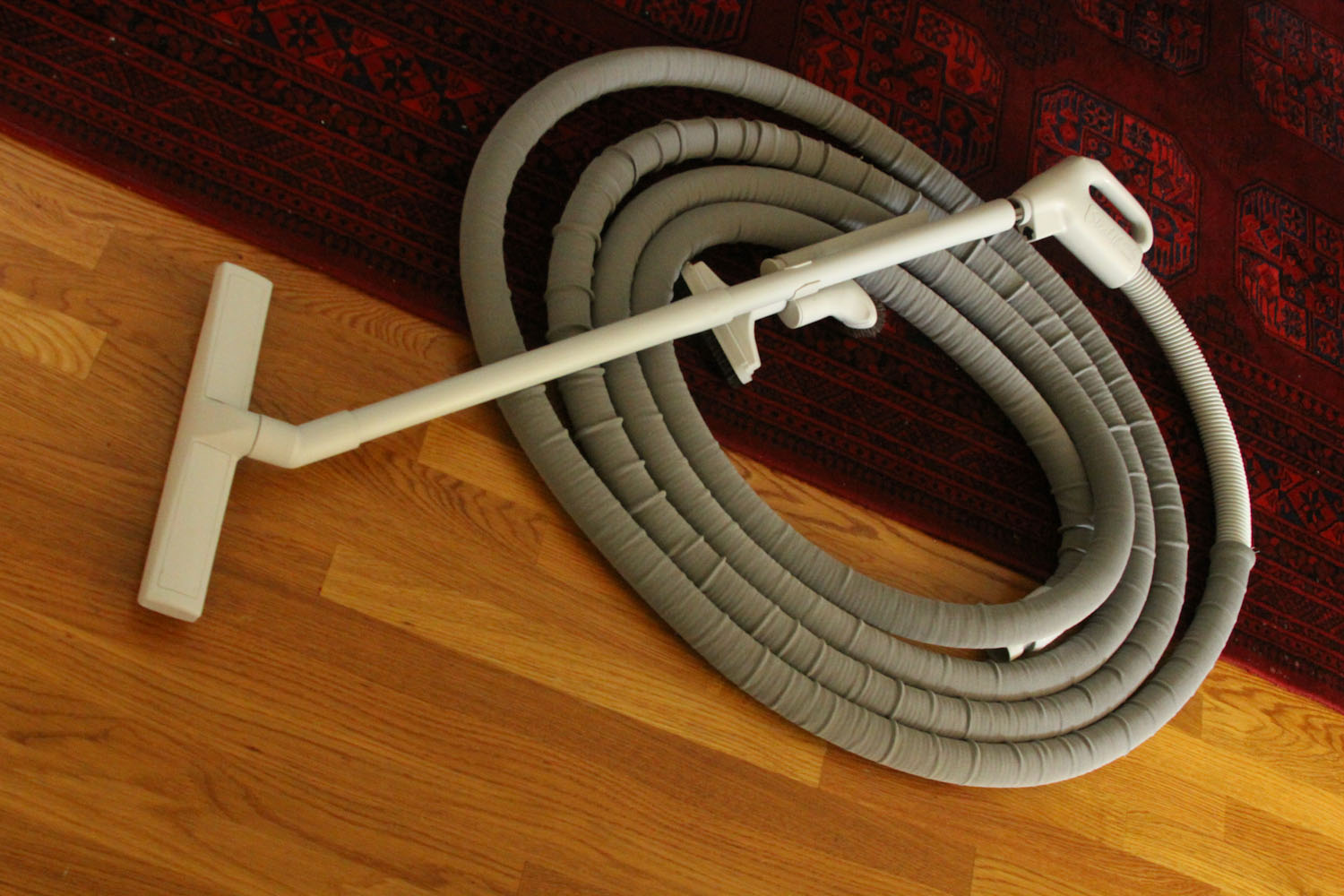
Central vacuum cleaning tools and hose (partially covered by a protective gray "hose sock")

Central vacuums can be equipped with either an electrical power brush or an air-driven power brush. The air-driven (or turbine) systems are frequently less expensive since they do not require electrical wires for power to be run to each wall inlet. Turbine-driven brushes tend to be louder than electric brushes; the noise from either is more noticeable in the absence of the "vacuum whine" produced by a portable vacuum. Many users find that the high suction of central vacuums is more than sufficient by itself for most casual cleaning jobs, but reserve a powered brush tool for more difficult tasks.

An alternative for storing vacuum hoses is the "Hide-A-Hose" system, which uses suction to draw the hose into the vacuum piping in the wall for storage. Hose lengths used are typically 30/40/50 ft (9/12/15 m). Successful installation of such systems requires special fittings, and careful design and workmanship, to ensure smooth hose retraction into the piping for storage.

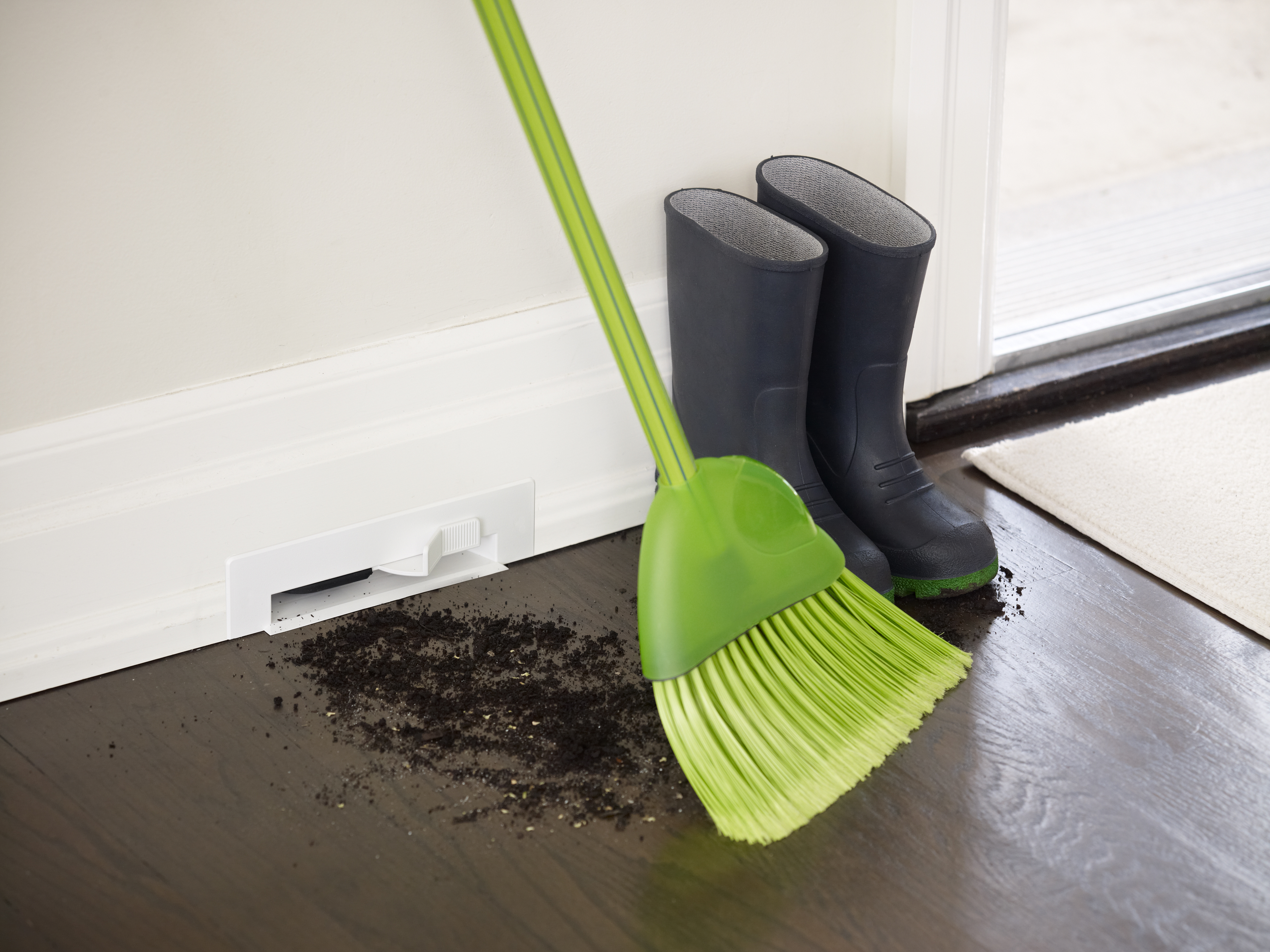
An automatic dustpan may be used with a broom for quick cleanups.

Automatic dustpans (e.g. "Vacpan" or "KickSweep") can be installed in the kick space beneath a kitchen, bathroom, or workroom countertop, enabling a person to use a standard broom to sweep debris directly into a vacuum inlet located there.

The "VacnSeal" is an accessory intended to be installed on the underside of a kitchen cabinet, over a countertop used for food preparation. The nozzle of the device is used to evacuate excess air from a zipper lock plastic food storage bag (e.g. Ziploc), which is said by the manufacturer to preserve food freshness for a longer period.

== Advantages ==
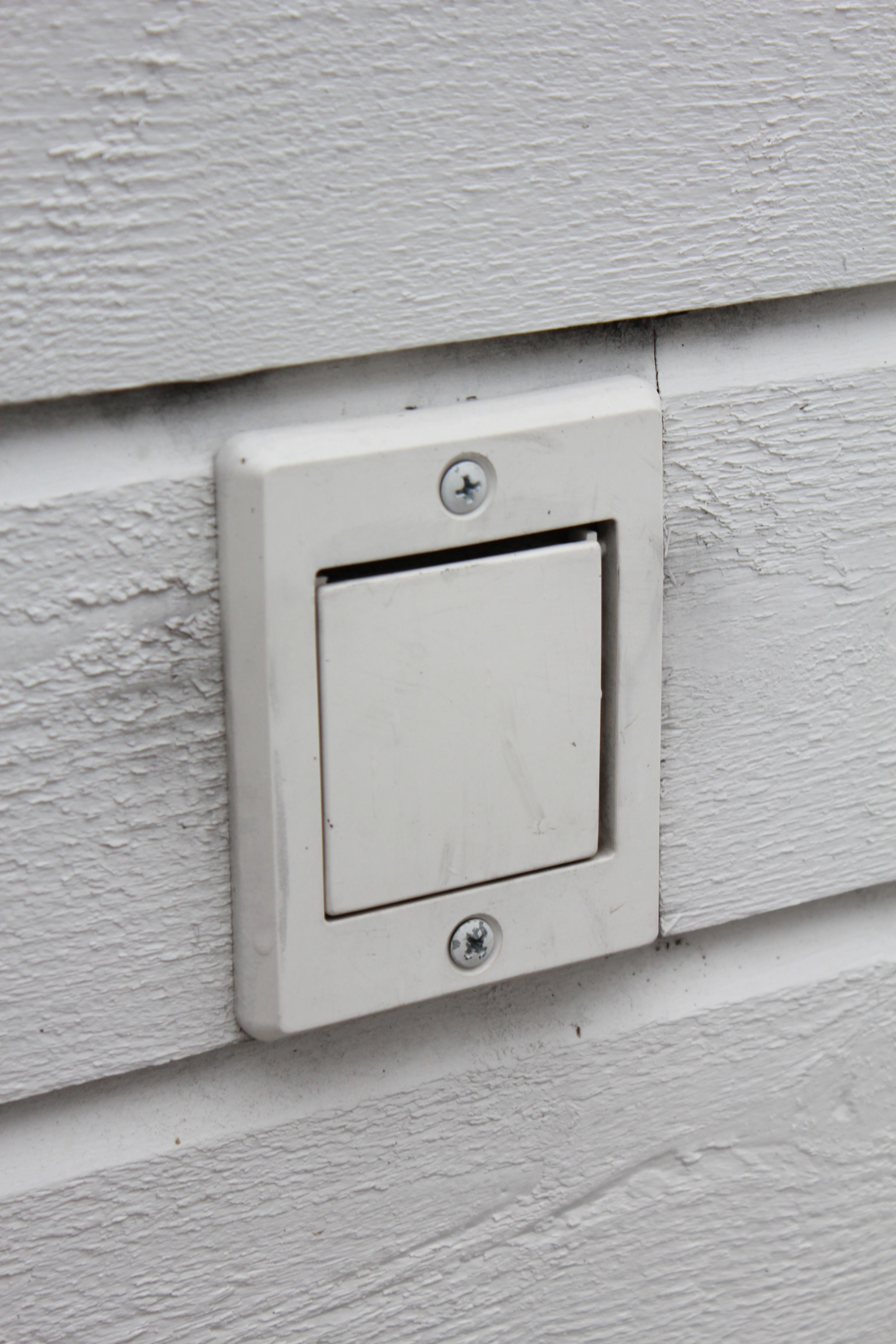
Central vacuum exhaust on building exterior

- Increased suction power — Because the vacuum cleaner motor and dirt collection system need not be portable, the weight and size of the unit are not as severely limited compared to a portable system; some units even use two motors for extra power. In addition, bagless filterless systems avoid the inevitable loss of suction in filtered systems caused by collected dust clogging the filters.
- Complete removal of allergens and noxious odors — Central vacuums generally do not recirculate exhaust air back into the space being cleaned. This contrasts with the well-known acrid "vacuum smell" of fine dust and hot air exhausted from a portable vacuum. Instead, central vacuums exhaust spent air into a utility space, or directly outdoors. An external exhaust outlet can be easily concealed under a porch or behind shrubbery, but in any case, is less obtrusive than a standard clothes dryer appliance vent. Central vacuum installations can earn points for Leadership in Energy and Environmental Design (LEED) home certification, Health House certification by the American Lung Association, or the National Green Building Standard of the National Association of Homebuilders (NAHB).
- Health benefits – A study conducted in 2001 at the University of California at Davis showed improvements in multiple aspects of health in 25 individuals with a documented history of type I hypersensitivity to house dust. Each of these individuals used either a Beam Central Vacuum System or their conventional vacuum for three months. At the end of this period, the individual switched over to the opposite limb of the study for three additional months. The results showed that using a central vacuum system was superior in seven domains of evaluation, including activity, sleep, non-nasal symptoms, practical problems, nasal symptoms, eye symptoms, and emotions.
- Low acoustic noise — Well-designed central vacuums are very quiet at the point of use since the powerful motor is located remotely in a utility space. This is a benefit to the person vacuuming, as well as anybody else occupying the space being cleaned, who otherwise might be woken up or driven out by the loud whine of a portable machine.
- Convenient cleaning — Setup, use, and storage of a vacuum hose and cleaning tool can be quick and efficient. Cleaning stairways is much easier without having to balance a heavy, hot appliance on each step, and coping with both an electrical cord and a vacuum hose.
- Infrequent emptying — Central vacuums can usually accumulate up to 10 kg (22 pounds) or more of dirt and dust before requiring disposal. This is an unavoidable dirty process that must be performed for any vacuum cleaner, but can be done much less frequently, perhaps a few times per year. Disposable filter bag systems are easier to empty, though care must be taken to refit the replacement bag to allow maximum airflow without leaks. Emptying the dust canister of a cyclonic vacuum is best done outdoors on a breezy day because of the fine dust cloud that can be released.
- Reduced damage and wear to furniture and walls — There is no heavy or awkward canister or other motorized unit to carry from room to room when vacuuming. Only a lightweight vacuum hose and the cleaning tool being used need to be carried.
- Durable equipment — Good-quality central vacuum systems can last indefinitely, perhaps requiring replacement of the motor brushes once every three to ten years.

== Disadvantages ==
A main disadvantage of central vacuums is the higher initial cost. In the United States, the average central vacuum system has an installed cost of around $1,000 to $1,500 as of 2026.

Central vacuums have much higher suction power. The increased suction can damage delicate fabrics such as sheer curtains. There has been a report of a pet bird accidentally being injured by a careless cleaner.

A central vacuum system is generally considered by building owners to be a permanent fixture of the building where it is installed, similar to plumbing and electrical fixtures. A short-term renter would most likely lose any investment made in improving the property unless a prior agreement were to be made with the property owner. Installation of a quality central vacuum increases the property value of a residence or commercial property.

== Maintenance ==
Central vacuum systems require periodic emptying of the dirt canister or replacing the filter bag, typically two to four times per year. In some models, it is also important that the filters be changed frequently, especially for designs where the just-filtered air passes through the motor for cooling. For filtered systems, the bag may sometimes need to be replaced long before it is filled to its nominal capacity, because of reduced suction due to clogging with dirt or fine dust.

Filterless cyclonic separation systems only require emptying the dirt collection container before the suction drops off as an almost-full condition is reached. Many cyclonic vacuum systems now feature translucent dirt collection canisters, allowing quick inspection without removing the canister.

Regardless of which dirt separation system is used, the electric motor may require lubrication of its bearings, or replacement of carbon brushes on an infrequent basis, usually measured in years.

Rarely, a central vacuum system may become clogged, especially if the piping was improperly installed, or if the system is abused by vacuuming sticky substances (such as paint or glue or wet foodstuffs). A homeowner can usually use simple tools and techniques to locate and remove the obstruction, or can hire a professional vacuum installer to do repairs. The flexible hose is often the location of a blockage, which can usually be dislodged by using a plumber's snake.

== Installation ==
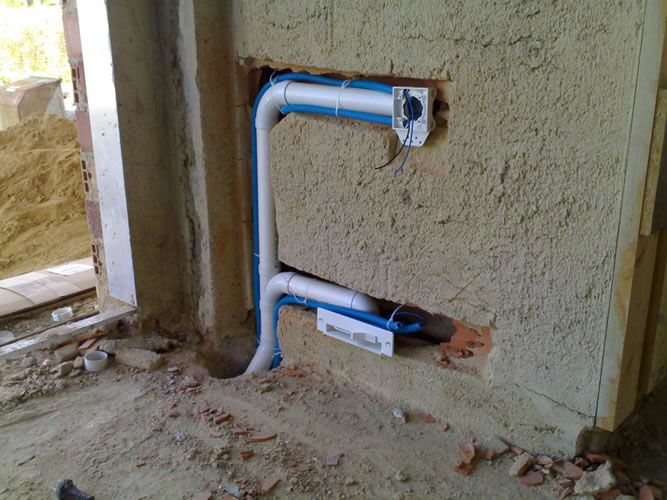
Rough-in pre-installation of tubing and wiring for a central vacuum system

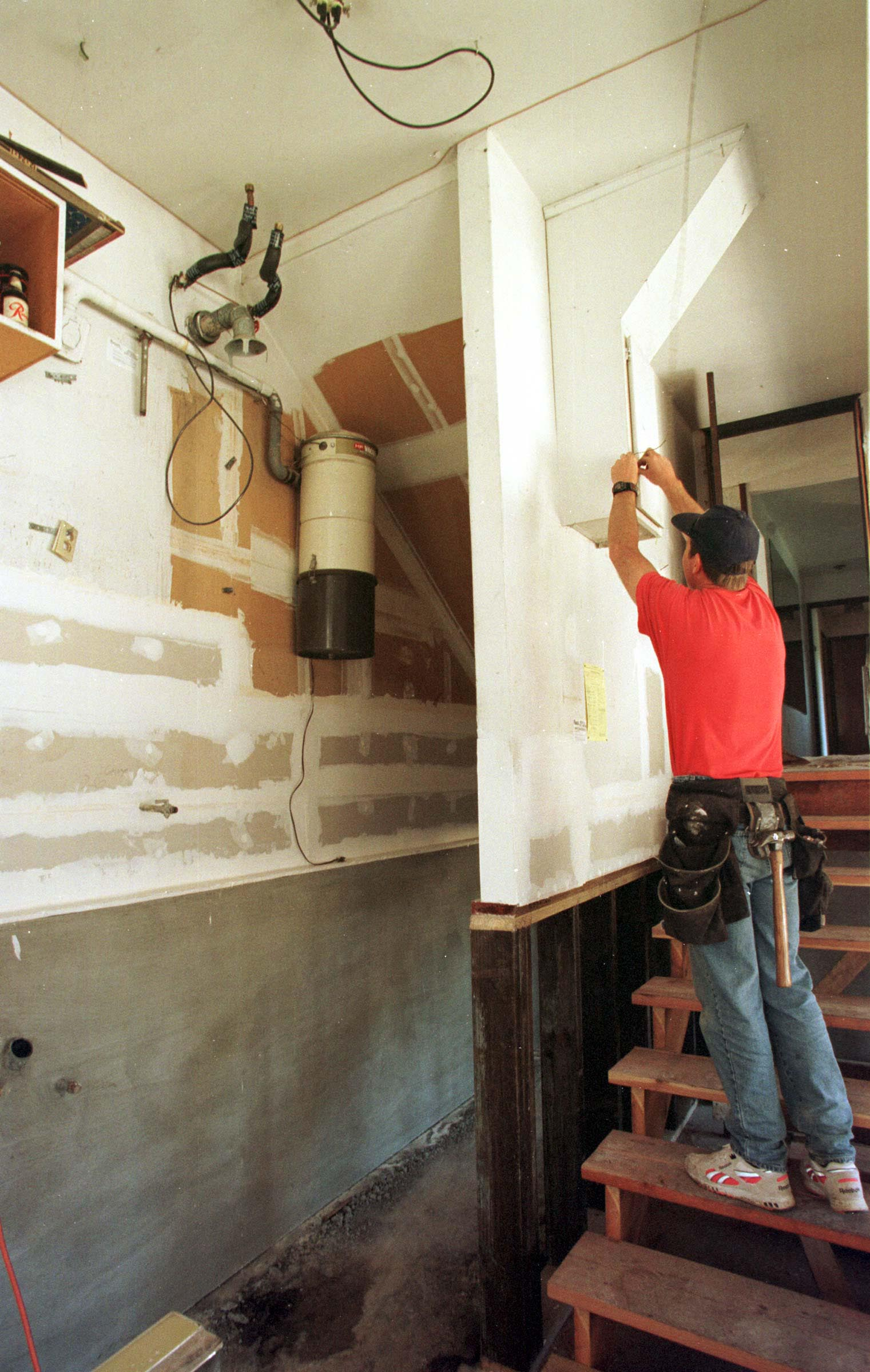
This central vacuum power unit has been installed high on a basement wall to reduce risk of damage from flooding, but requiring a ladder for maintenance.

A principal concern when designing a central vacuum system is avoiding situations likely to cause clogging of the piping with debris such as toothpicks, hairpins, needles, or similar-shaped objects. The most important safeguard is at the vacuum inlets, which are intentionally designed with a tighter radius of curvature than any other bends in the system. This is done to ensure that if any vacuumed debris becomes stuck, it will jam right at the inlet, where it is easiest to discover and remove. Well-designed central vacuum piping rarely or never clogs unless severely abused (e.g. with wet sticky substances).

The wall inlets are connected to the power unit by piping which can be run inside walls, or through vertical pipe chases, closets, the attic, basement, or the cold air return ducts (if permitted by building code). In new construction, the vacuum piping is usually installed during a "rough-in" phase once the building interior framing is complete, after other in-wall utilities (e.g. plumbing, HVAC, electrical, etc.), and just before drywall, panelling, or other surface finishes are installed. However, there are advantages to installing vacuum piping before cabling (for electric power, telephone, Internet data, etc.), since routing of wiring is usually less constrained than piping. In a similar manner to plumbing and electrical fixtures, the vacuum inlet fittings and final connections are installed in a finish phase, after the wall finishing is complete.

Vacuum piping systems may be installed by electricians, plumbers, specialized contractors, or even do-it-yourself (DIY) homeowners.

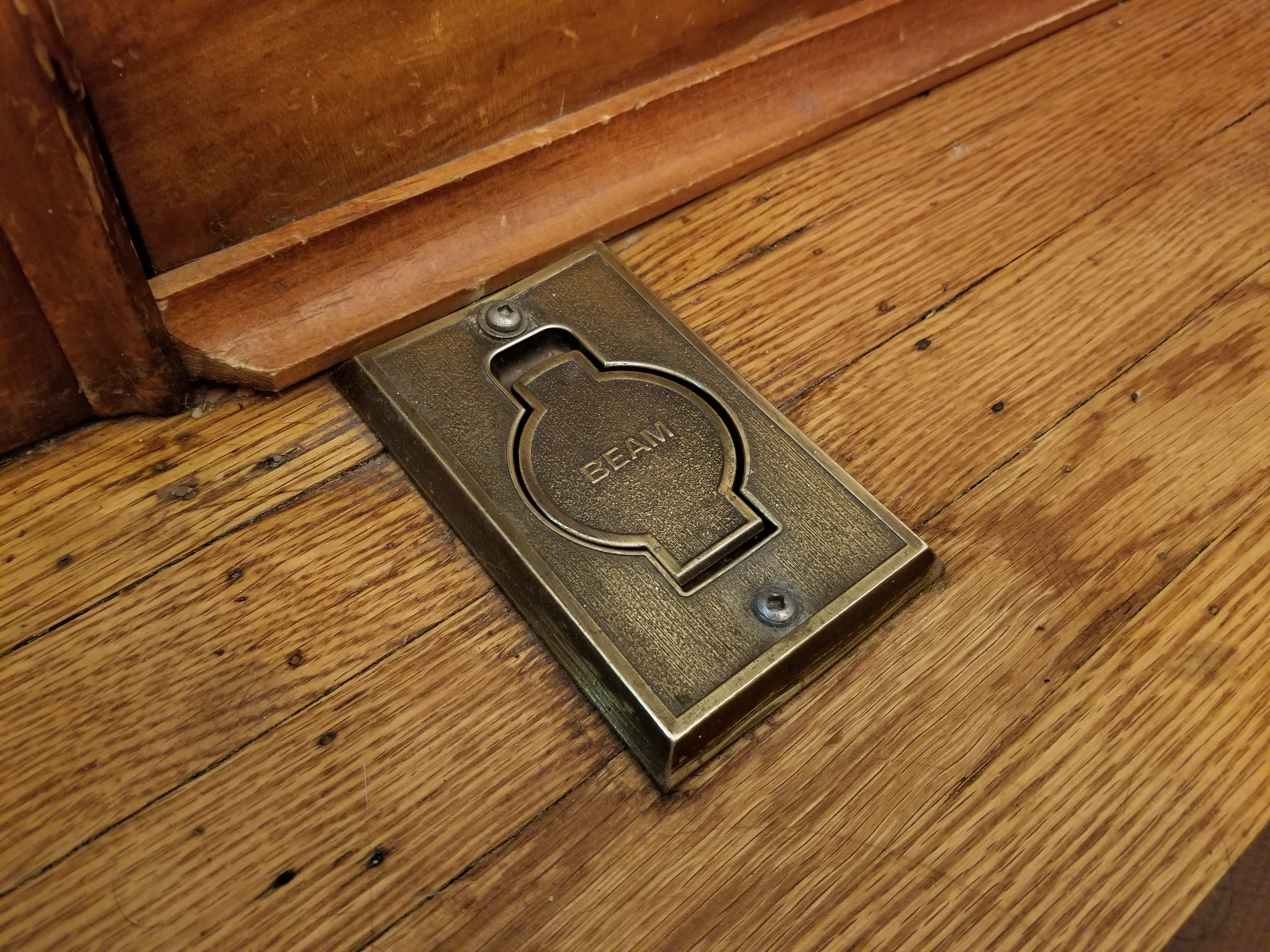
Metal floor inlets are used in locations in existing structures where it would be impossible or impractical to install standard wall inlets

A typical house requires two to four inlets per floor, although many users find the central vacuum so convenient that they later install additional inlets in the basement, attic, garage, and even on the back porch (for vacuuming car interiors, storage sheds, etc.). A rough rule of thumb is one inlet per 600 square feet (56 m^{2}) of floor area. Inlets should be placed in convenient locations unlikely to be blocked by open doors or furniture, such as in central hallways. A non-stretchable cord of appropriate length (or a thin wire on an architectural scale drawing) can be used to check for the adequate reach of a vacuum hose.

The routing and design of the vacuum piping layout are very similar to drain-waste-vent (DWV) plumbing, with the exception that pipe pitch or gradient for drainage is not required. Vacuum system designs share with DWV designs a concern about eliminating internal roughness, ridges, burrs, sharp turns, pockets, or other obstructions to smooth flow that might cause build-up of material into pipe blockages. Piping for central vacuums has a few peculiar constraints of its own, and a few unusual capabilities, such as the ability to run a pipe straight upwards after a sufficiently long, horizontal running start. In some jurisdictions, fire code regulations require that an intumescent firestop collar be installed around the pipe when it penetrates a firewall. If a pipe runs through an unheated space, it may require external pipe insulation to prevent water vapor from condensing inside. These and other installation details are described in installation manuals available from manufacturers.

Two different diameters of thin-wall (typically 20 gauge or "Schedule 20") plastic piping have traditionally been used in the US. For years, HP Vacuflo advocated the slightly smaller 1 13/16-inch (4.6 cm) piping size (outside diameter), claiming that their studies showed that it was less likely to clog. However in 1986, that manufacturer also switched to the de facto industry standard size of 2-inch (5.1 cm) outside diameter piping and corresponding fittings.

Another piping option, which has been used in commercial applications and with DIYers, is "Schedule 40" standard 2-inch plumbing pipe. The main advantage of plumbing pipes is widespread availability, slightly larger diameter, and thicker walls. The thicker material increases durability and ruggedness in installations where pipe runs are exposed to mechanical damage or abuse (although this has rarely been reported as a problem with thin-wall piping). The primary disadvantage is that the thicker material makes the pipe less flexible, heavier, and somewhat more difficult to work with. The thicker pipe walls increase the outside diameter of the pipe to 2 3/8 inches (6.0 cm), requiring fittings designed for this. To use plumbing pipes for central vacuum installations, special adapters (available from many central vacuum retailers) are required to connect the plumbing pipe to the central vacuum inlets and power unit. However, every manufacturer of central vacuums currently recommends use of specialized vacuum tubing conforming to ASTM Ruling F2158 as recommended by the Uniform Building Code (UBC), to reduce the risk of clogging.

== See also ==
- Pneumatic refuse conveying system – larger central vacuum systems used to dispose of industrial or municipal rubbish
