= Corian =

Brand of material composed of acrylic polymer and alumina trihydrate

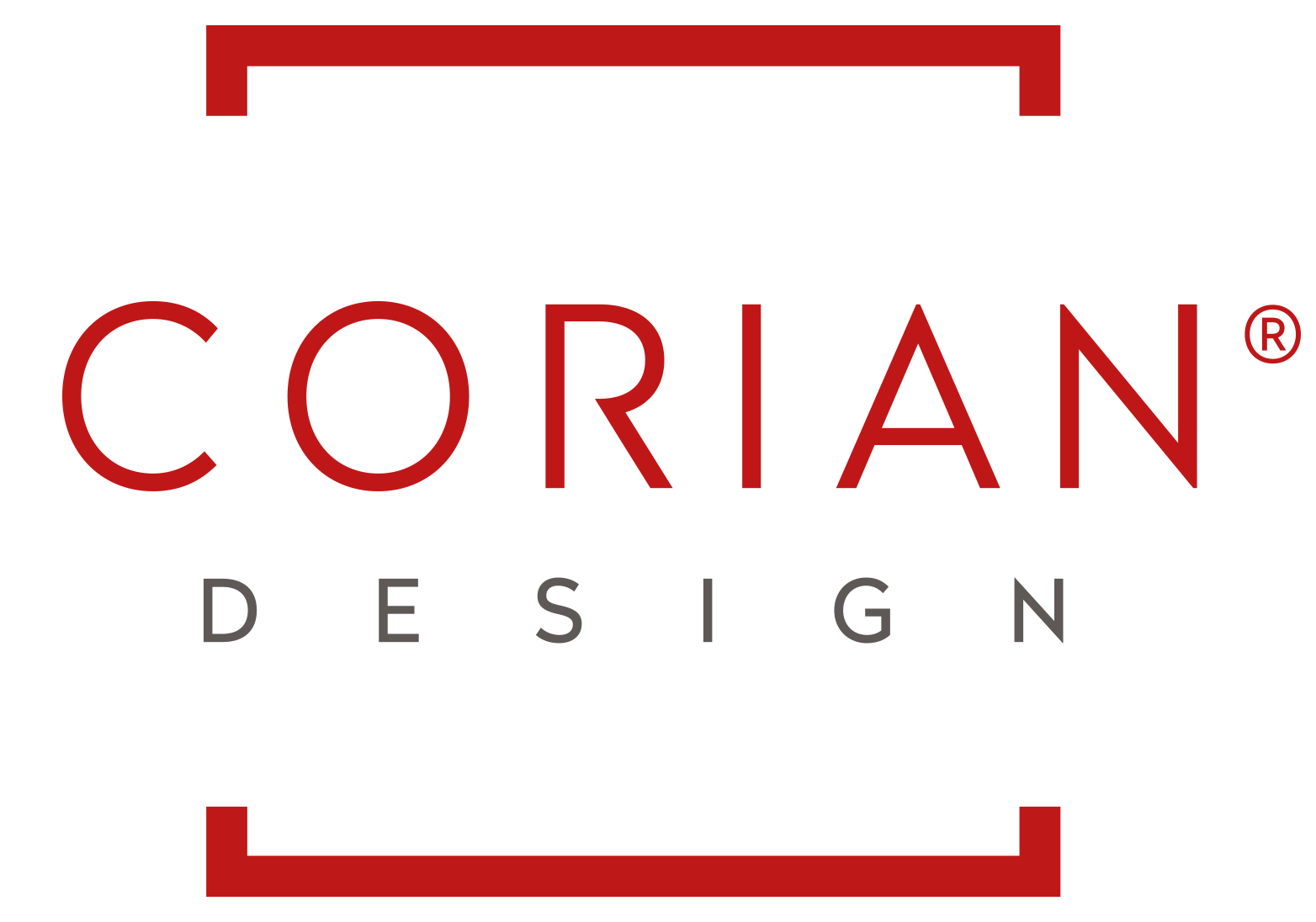
Corian brand logo

Former logo

Corian is a brand of solid surface material created by DuPont. Its primary use is as countertops, benchtop surface, wash basins, and wall paneling. It is composed of acrylic polymer and alumina trihydrate (ATH), a material derived from bauxite ore.

== History ==
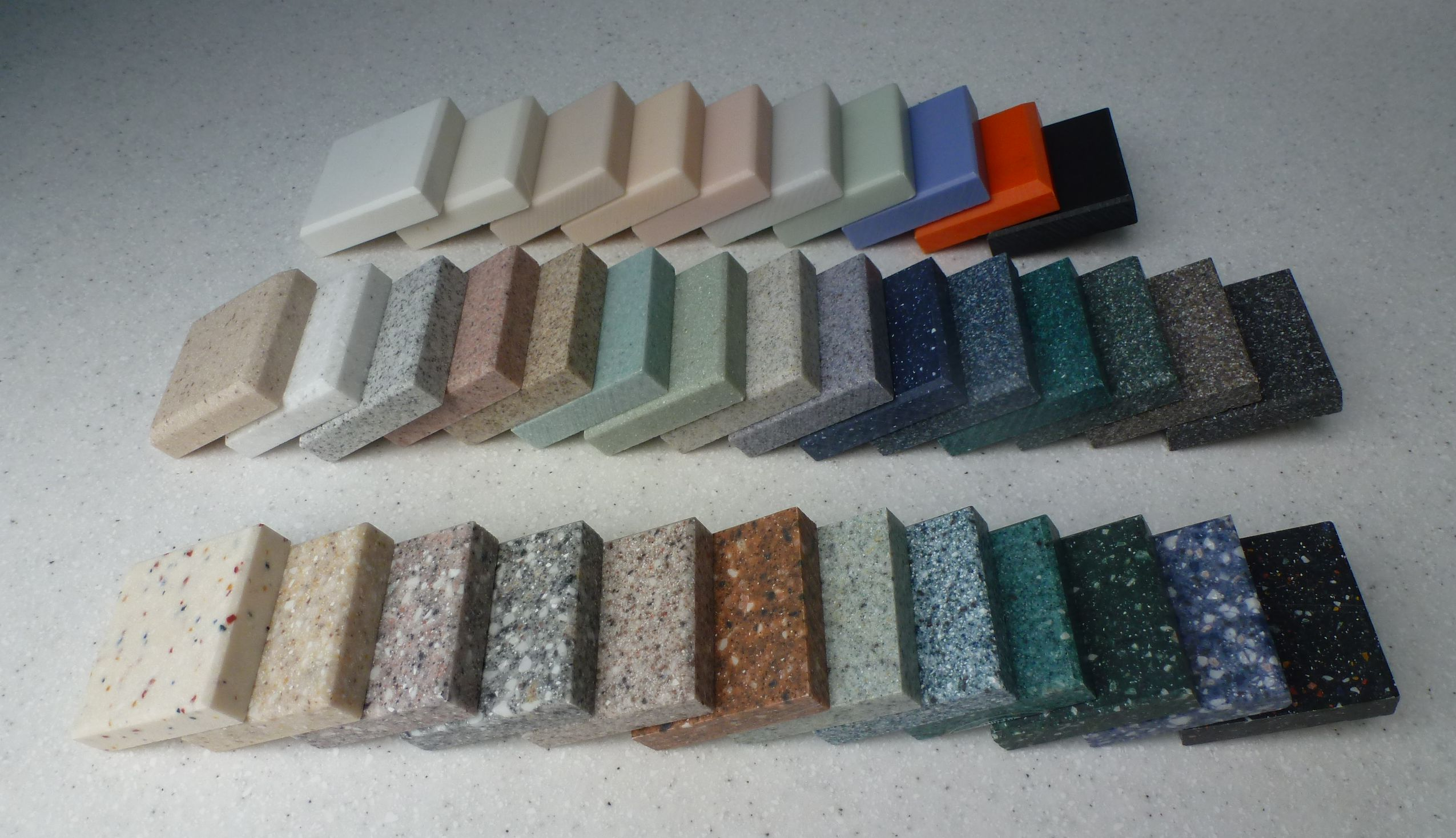
Corian samples

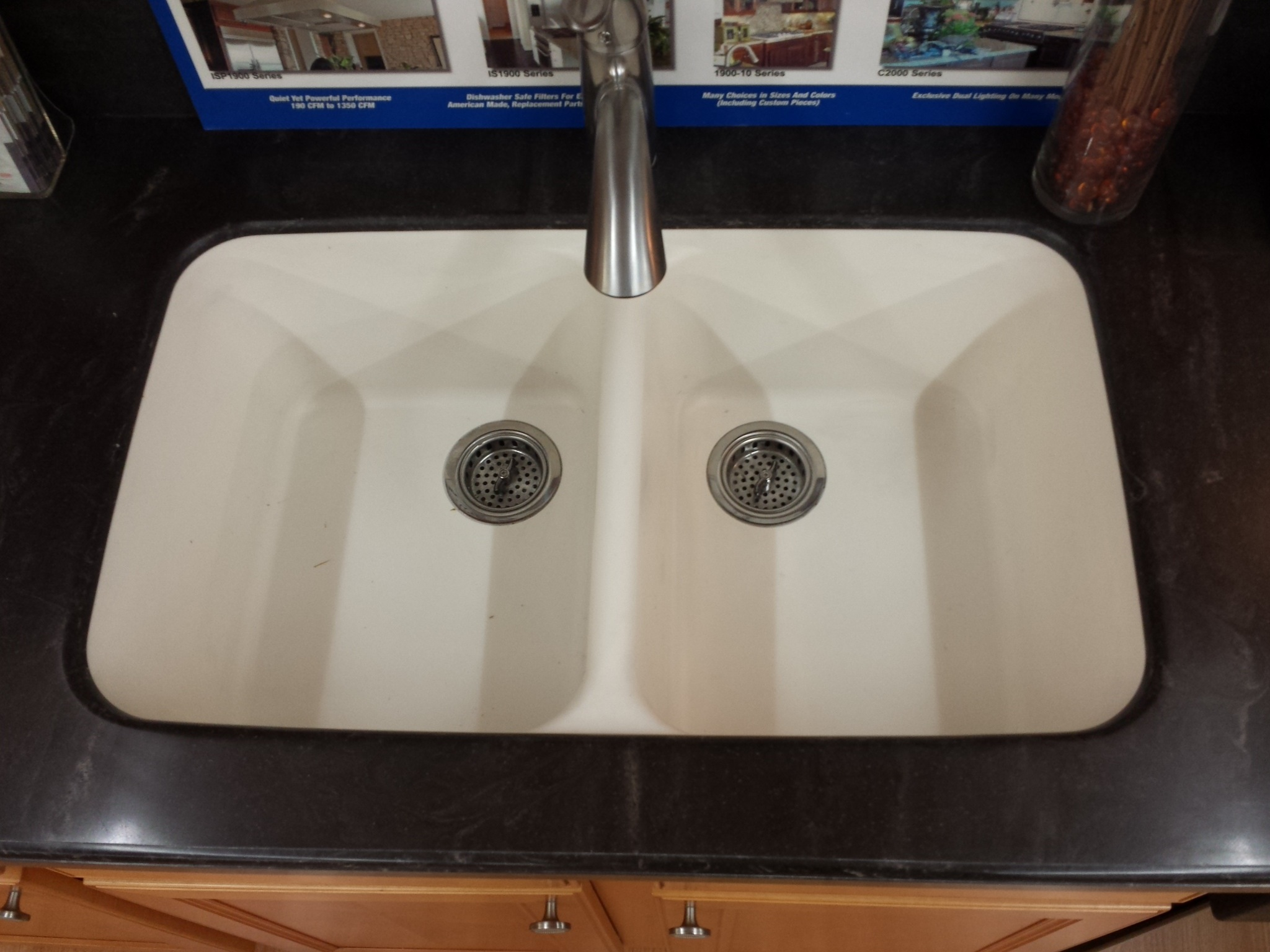
An integrated Corian sink

Corian is the original material of this type, created by Donald Slocum, a chemist at DuPont, in 1967. His name appears on the patent issued in October 1968. The product was first introduced for sale in 1971, at the National Association of Home Builders meeting in Houston, Texas.

Originally conceived as a kitchen and bath material available in a single color, Corian is now manufactured and delivered in more than 100 colors and patterns. In 2014 DuPont introduced a range with darker colours that are more resistant to scratches and cuts than earlier-generation Corian material.

== Material characteristics ==
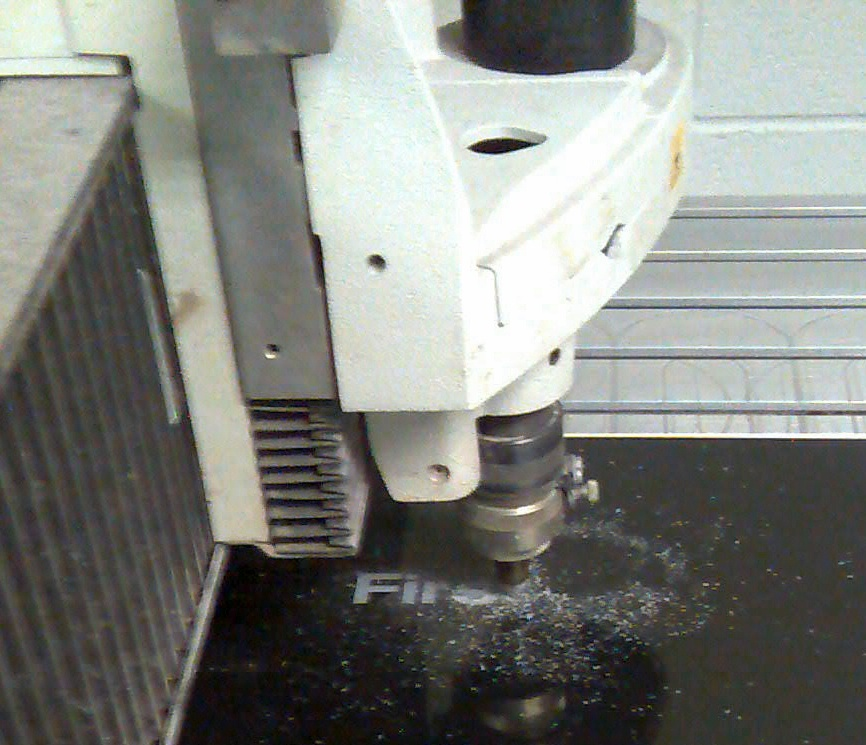
Corian being engraved for signage

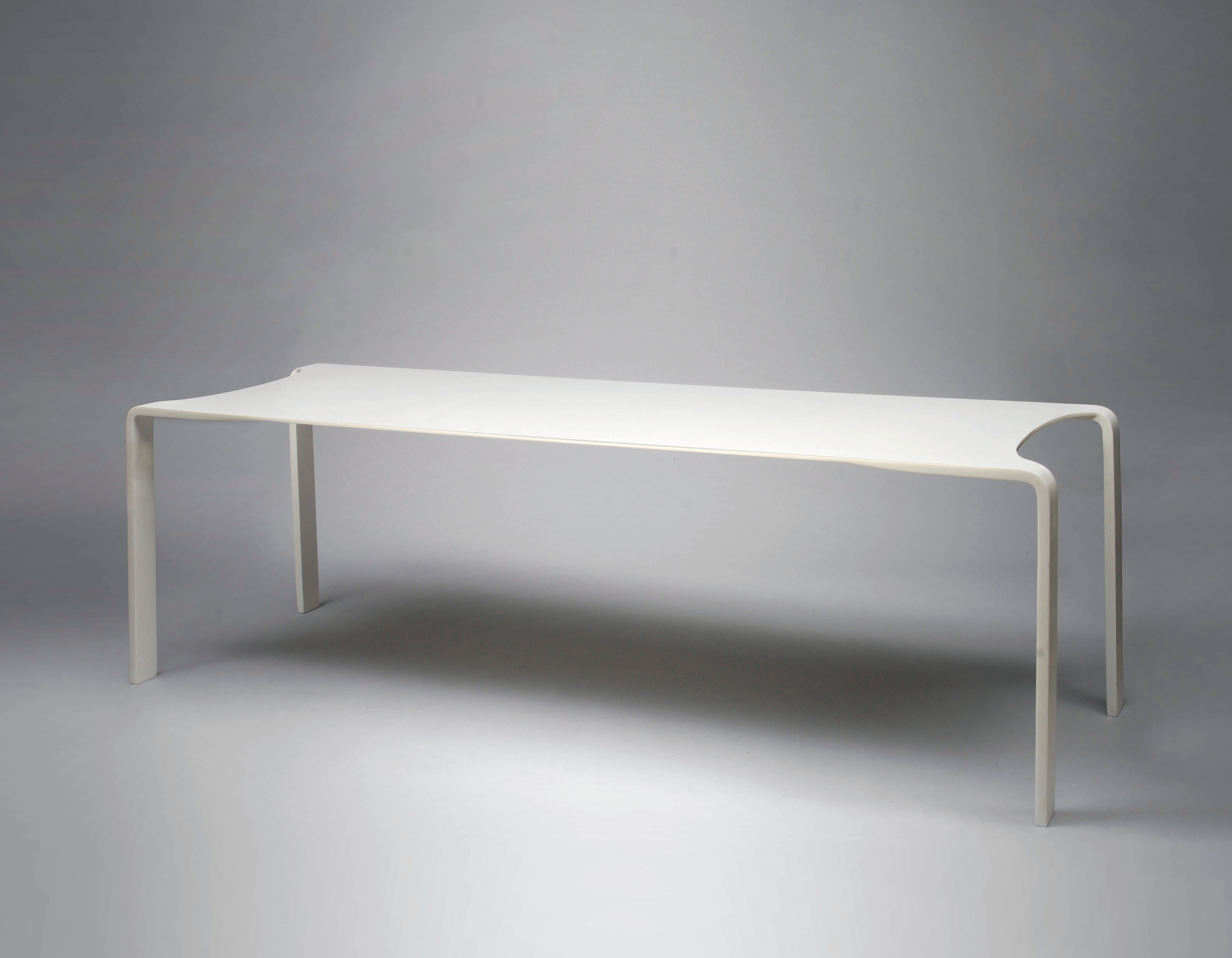
"Walking" table made of thermoformed Corian

Corian consists mainly of aluminum trihydroxide (55–60%) and polymethyl methacrylate (34–45%) with trace elements of iron oxide black, carbon black, titanium dioxide, colorants and methyl methacrylate. Its characteristics includes:

- Non-porous
- Stain resistant
- Seamless appearance: In the fabrication process, joints can be made nearly invisible by joining adjacent pieces with Corian's own color-matched two-part acrylic adhesive. The joined edge can be sanded and polished to create a visually imperceptible joint.
- Repairable and renewable: Cuts and scratches can be abraded then further buffed to restore original surface finish.
- Thermoformable: Flexible when heated, Corian can be shaped and molded into a variety of forms which can be used in commercial and artistic projects through a process called thermoforming.

Heat resistance: the material is heat resistant up to 100°C (212°F), but can be damaged by excess heat. DuPont recommends the use of trivets when the material is installed in kitchens.

Scratches: The material can be scratched, with scratches particularly noticeable on darker colors.

Corian does not lose its visual appearance or fade for many years, sometime decades.

Corian is manufactured in three thicknesses: 6 millimetres (0.24 in), 12 millimetres (0.47 in), and 19 millimetres (0.75 in). Most Corian is manufactured at a DuPont facility near Buffalo, New York. Cross-section cuts show consistent color and particulate patterning evenly distributed throughout the material, giving rise to the category name "solid surface".

== Safety ==
=== Safety of installed material ===
Corian meets or exceeds current emissions guidelines for volatile organic compounds (VOCs), hazardous air pollutants (HAPs) and is "Greenguard Indoor Air Quality Certified". Corian is non-toxic and non-allergenic to humans. It is free of heavy metals and complies with the EU Directive 2002/95EC on the Restriction of Hazardous Substances (RoHS). Its hygienic properties make it popular in installations where maintaining sanitary conditions is important (e.g. hospitals and restaurants).

=== Fabricator safety ===
In 2014, the New England Journal of Medicine reported a case of a 64-year-old exercise physiologist who died from lung disease consistent with idiopathic pulmonary fibrosis after 16 years of exposure to Corian dust. Dust from Corian was found in the patient's shop of Corian fabrication and lung upon autopsy. The authors said that the case was consistent with Corian dust causing idiopathic pulmonary fibrosis, but did not prove causality.
