= Engineered stone =

Composite material

Engineered stone is a class of artificial stone, a composite material made of crushed stone bound together by an adhesive to create a solid surface. The adhesive is most commonly polymer resin, with some newer versions using cement mix. This category includes engineered quartz (SiO_{2}), polymer concrete and engineered marble stone. The application of these products depends on the original stone used. For engineered marbles the most common application is indoor flooring and walls, while the quartz based product is used primarily for kitchen countertops as an alternative to laminate or granite. Related materials include geopolymers and cast stone. Unlike terrazzo, the material is factory made in either blocks or slabs, cut and polished by fabricators, and assembled at the worksite.

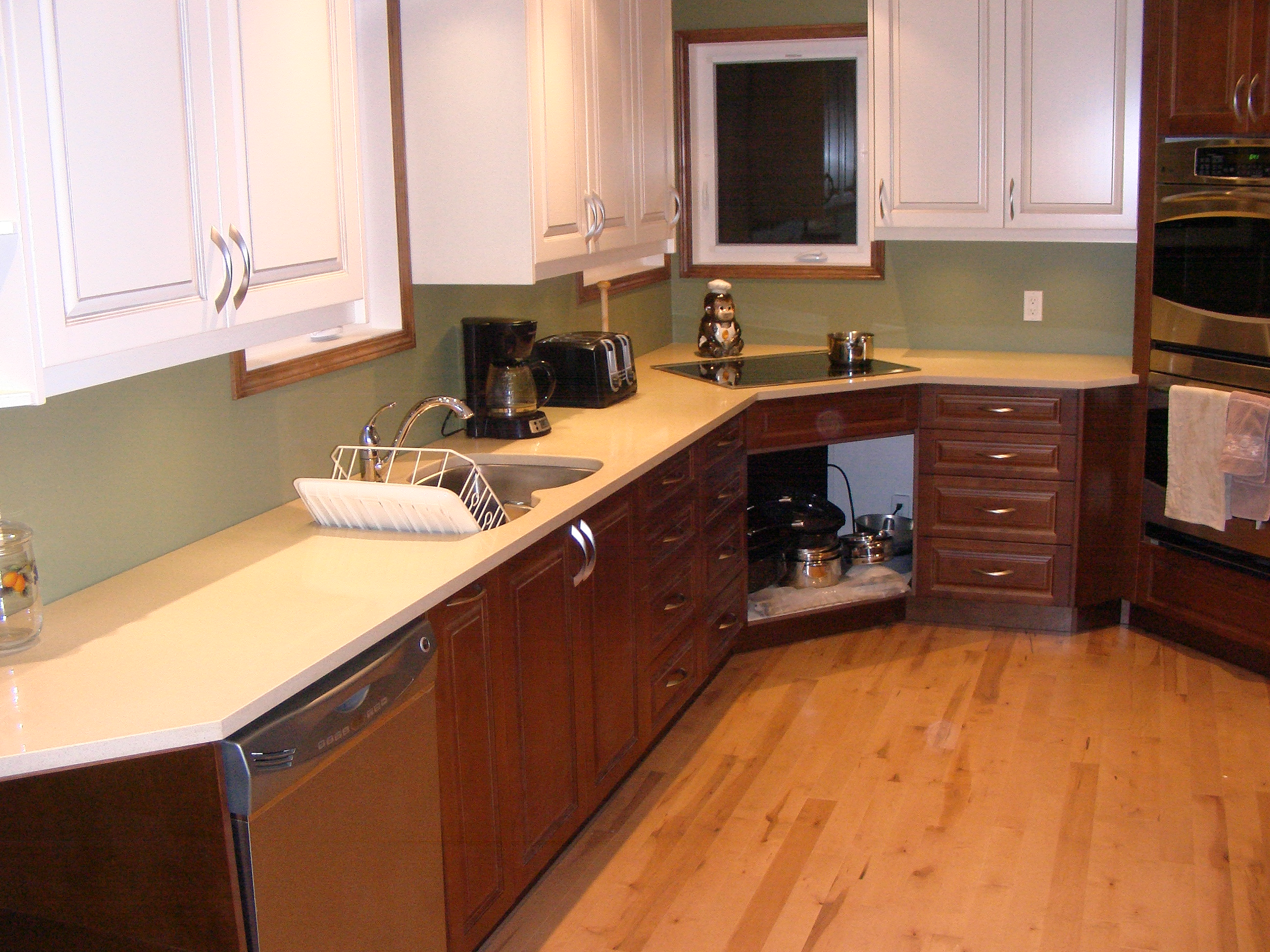
Engineered stone kitchen countertops with undermount sink and cooktop installed. Tops are cut and polished at the fabricator's shop.

Engineered stone is also commonly referred to as agglomerate or agglomerated stone, the last term being that recognised by European Standards (EN 14618), although to add to the terminological confusion, this standard also includes materials manufactured with a cementitious binder. The quartz version (which end consumers are much more likely to directly deal with) is commonly known as 'quartz surface' or just 'quartz'.

== Composition ==
99.9% pure silica in grits and powder form constitutes 90–93% of the body by weight dispersed in a matrix of unsaturated polyester resin (7–10%) mixed with peroxide catalyst and cobalt accelerator which facilitates the curing of the thermoset at ambient temperature. The cured material is normally kept for 24–48 hours before polishing and finishing absorbers are also dosed into the chemical mix to inhibit the discoloration as a result of reaction of unsaturated polyester resin with UV light. Engineered quartz stones manufactured by using unsaturated polyester resins are characterized by low water absorption, superior chemical durability, high hardness, flexural strength and good thermal shock resistance compared to granite and marble.

== Process ==
Compaction by vibrocompression vacuum process uses elastomeric molds in which a crushed stone/resin mix is cast on a moving belt. The mixture of approximately 93% stone aggregates and 7% polyester resin by weight (66% quartz and 34% resin by volume) is heated and compressed under vacuum in a large press. The vibration helps compact the mixture and results in an isotropic slab with virtually no porosity. Engineered stone is then processed in basically the same manner as its natural counterpart.

Some companies import boulders themselves to crush into agglomerates (stone powders) of various grain size for their products, others simply buy already-crushed stone powders.

== Properties ==
Engineered stone is typically worked in the same way as natural stone using a water jet cutter or a diamond blade. This is in contrast with solid surface materials which can be cut with regular saws.

The material can be produced in either 12 mm, 20 mm or 30 mm thicknesses. The most common slab format is 3040 mm x 1440 mm for Quartz and 3050 mm x 1240 mm for Breton-based marbles, but other sizes like 3040 mm x 1650 mm are produced according to market demand.

Engineered stone is non porous, more flexible, and harder than many types of natural stone. Since it has a uniform internal structure, it does not have hidden cracks or flaws that may exist in natural stone and also has a color/pattern consistency from slab to slab. Polyester resin binding agents allow some flexibility, preventing cracking under flexural pressure. But, the binding agents often continue to harden, leading to a loss of flexural strength over time. The polyester resins are not completely UV stable and engineered stone should not be used in outdoor applications. Continuous exposure to UV can cause discoloration of the stone, and breakdown of the resin binder.

The material is sometimes damaged by direct application of heat. Quartz engineered stone is less heat resistant than other stone surfaces including most granite, marble and limestone; but is not affected by temperatures lower than 150 °C (300 °F). Quartz engineered stone can be damaged by sudden temperature changes. Manufacturers recommend that hot pots and pans never be placed directly on the surface, and that a hot pad or trivet is used under portable cooking units.

When used as floor tiles, care is required in ensuring compatibility with the adhesive used. Reaction resin adhesives and rapid drying cementitious adhesives are generally successful, but bond failure or discoloration can occur with other cementitious adhesives. Additionally, agglomerate stone tiles are more sensitive to both thermal expansion and contraction and to dampness from underlying screeds, necessitating the inclusion of movement joints at a higher frequency than for stone or ceramic floor tiles (see for example British Standard BS 5385-5: 2011) and verification by testing of the dryness of underlying layers.

== Difference between marble and quartz ==
Although both the marble- and quartz-based engineered stones are created through a similar process, and multiple companies produce both at the same time, there are distinct differences in their properties and applications.

Marble is a relatively soft material which is prone to scratching, but simple to maintain. Typically it can be repeatedly polished until it becomes too thin. Marble is much more common and accessible around the world, and comes in a wider variety, which gives its engineered counterpart a significant edge in pricing, and more variety in pattern and colors. Engineered marble is typically used as flooring materials for large commercial projects such as hotels, shopping centers, business lobbies, where it combines the attractive appearance of marble with budget-friendly cost and reliable delivery time.

Quartz is a much harder material. The Mohs scale hardness of marble is roughly 3, whereas that of quartz is around 7. This makes it much more resistant to scratching, however it also makes re-polishing and general processing a more difficult task, which is why it is most commonly used for kitchen counter tops, where the value added through processing can offset its considerably higher cost.

There is also a difference between quartz and quartzite, which may be confused because of the similarities in the name. Quartz countertops are man-made even though quartz is a natural material. Quartzite countertops on the other hand are natural and they are considered to be a high end countertop material.

== Health issues ==
As with any silica-containing stone, silicosis can result from breathing dust produced when cutting or processing engineered stone made with quartz. The risk of inhaling quartz dust can be mitigated by taking appropriate safety precautions. Risk of silicosis is high when little or no safety precautions or protective equipment are used. This may occur in small shops or in countries where the industry is not regulated or monitored.

In Australia, a National Dust Diseases Taskforce was established in July 2019. In Western Australia, legislation was introduced to support the early detection of silicosis caused by engineered stone. Medical practitioners in Western Australia are advised to follow strict guidelines for the health surveillance of at risk workers. In February 2023 Australian trade unions called for banning the importation of engineered stone into Australia. In December of the same year, Australia became the first country to announce a ban of engineered stone in response to workers developing silicosis. The ban came into effect on 1 July 2024.

In California, 500 workers at quartz countertop fabrication shops have been diagnosed with silicosis as of January 2026. Inspections by safety officials in 2019 and 2020 showed that 72% of these shops were out of compliance with federal silica dust exposure standards. The state's Occupational Safety & Health Standards Board approved emergency regulations in December 2023.
