= Solid surface material =

Artificial material used for countertops

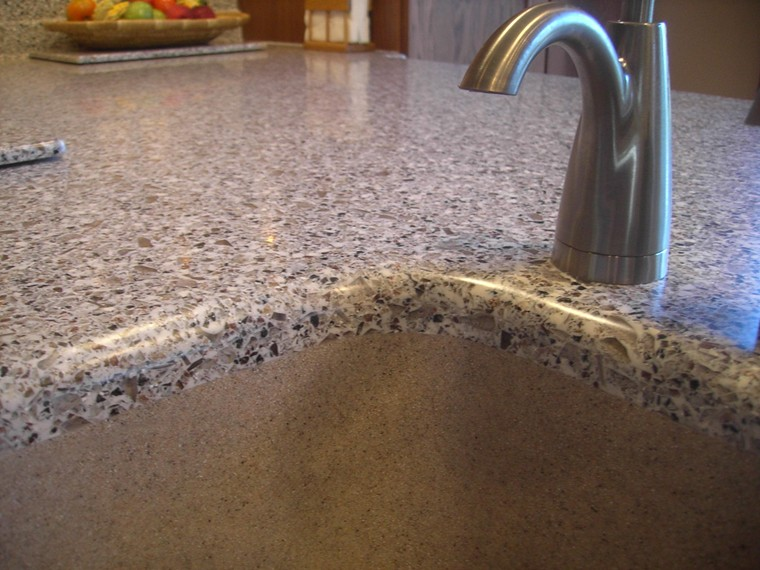
Solid surface material kitchen countertop

Solid surface material, also known as solid surface composite, is an artificial composite material usually combining alumina trihydrate (ATH), acrylic, epoxy or polyester resins and pigments. It is most frequently used for seamless countertop installations.

A solid surface material was first introduced by DuPont in 1967 under the name of Corian. Since the expiration of their patent other manufacturers have entered the market with their own branded products. These include Krion by Porcelanosa Group, HIMACS by LX Hausys, Hanex Solid Surface by Hyundai L&C, Staron by Lotte Chemical, Evo Surfaces and Velstone.

== History and characteristics ==
DuPont created and marketed the first solid surface material in 1967, trademarked as Corian. The product was invented by DuPont biochemist Don Slocum that year, and was patented in 1968. Corian consists of a blend of alumina trihydrate, acrylic resin and various pigments. Originally marketed as a countertop material for both residential and commercial applications, it has since been used in many other applications including furniture.

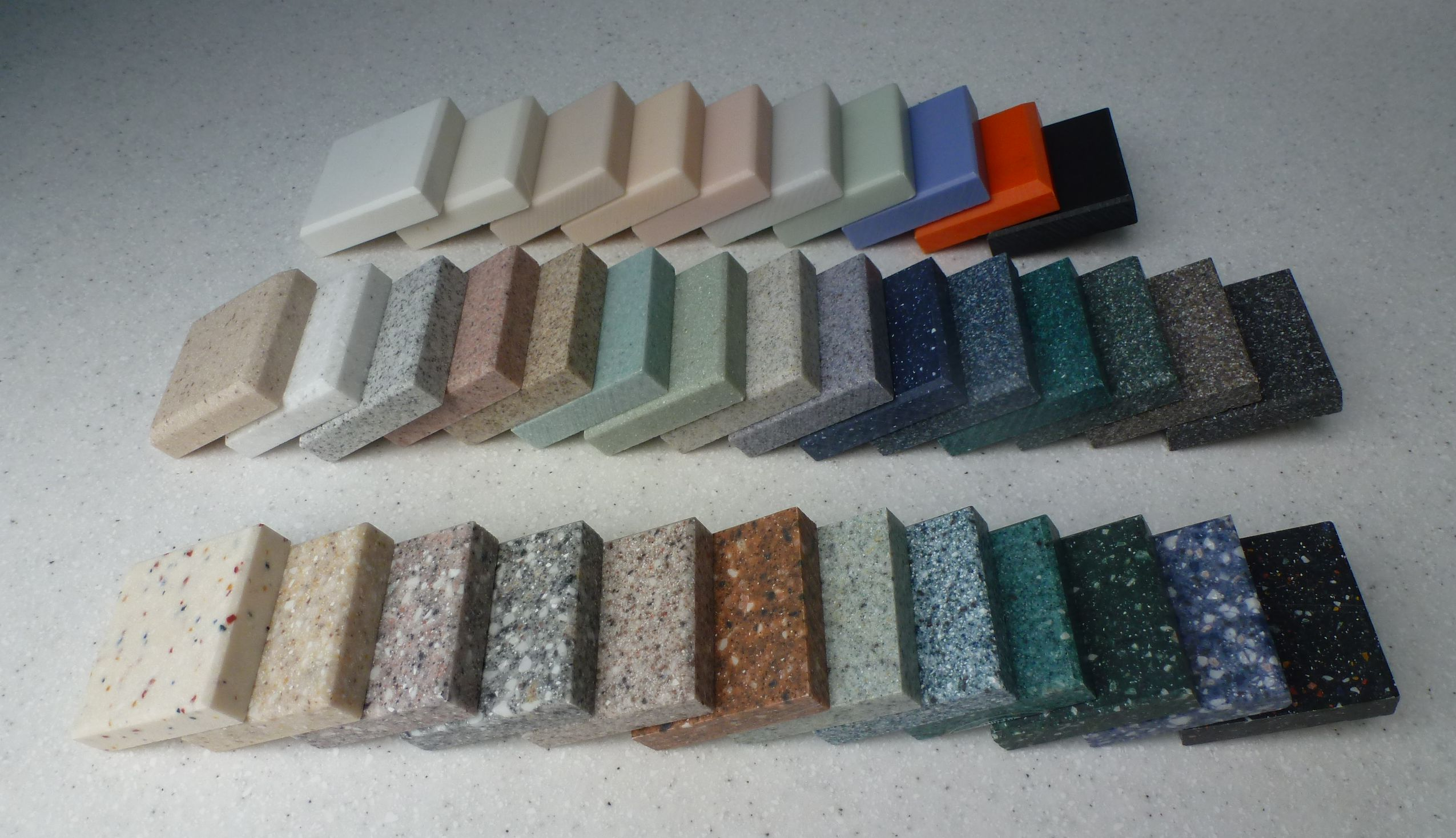
Samples of Corian, a solid surface material, showing some of the possible colors and patterns

Other companies introduced competing products of greater or lesser similarity. Competitors included Gibraltar, Fountainhead, Avonite, Hanex, HIMACS, Staron, and Surrell. Some of these brands used different resins such as polyester which have different performance characteristics and some are no longer on the market. Solid surface materials are usually approximately 70% aluminum trihydrate.

Solid surface materials are available in a wide variety of colors and patterns. Some of the patterns emulate granite and marble, while other patterns are original. The most common thickness is 1/2" (13 mm) although other thicknesses are available for other applications, such as tub and shower surrounds.

These products are non-porous, sanitary, moderately heat resistant and repairable. Versions of solid surface materials based on acrylic resins can be thermoformed into components of various curved shapes.

== Fabrication and installation ==
Standards for properly working with solid surface materials are well established within the construction industry. These include procedures for creating inconspicuous seams, built-up decorative edges and various styles of backsplashes, and for installing sinks, including integral solid surface sinks. The use of power tools with solid surface materials generates airborne dust, but any effect on health from exposure is poorly understood; one death from pulmonary fibrosis was reported in 2014 in association with long-term exposure.

== See also ==
- Engineered stone
- Epoxy granite
- Paper composite panels
