= Kick space =

Recessed space at the base of cabinets

A kick space, also known as a toe kick or toe space, is recessed space at the base of most floor-mounted kitchen cabinets.

== Description ==
Traditionally, a kick space is allowed for in modern cabinet designs by creating a separate, recessed platform upon which the cabinetry may rest. The kick space is intended to prevent potential toe injuries and allow for closer proximity to a countertop (the toes being the furthest-extending ground-level parts of the human body). Typical dimensions are roughly 4 inches (10 cm) high by 3 inches (7.6 cm) deep.

A fully enclosed cabinet base with a kick space

Home designers often take advantage of this space by including heating or ventilation ducts here. It also provides the advantage of serving as a "bumper against over-zealous mopping and vacuuming".

== History ==
The kick space became more common in the 20th century. With a burgeoning middle class and advancements in industry and domesticity, countertops became a more prominent work surface. Whereas previously most standing crafts were done at tables, there developed a need for a work counter to which one could comfortably stand directly adjacent. As the name would suggest, the kick space provides a space in which one's toes can rest.

== See also ==
- Plinth, support of a statue or a vase
