= Countertop =

Horizontal work surface

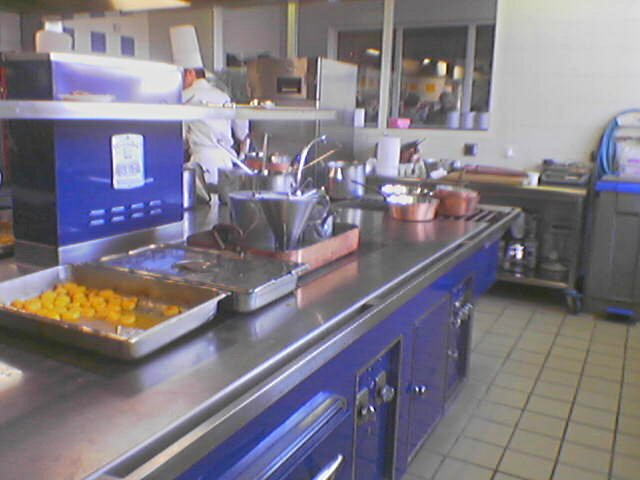
A stainless steel countertop

A countertop, also counter top, counter, benchtop, worktop (British English) or kitchen bench (Australian or New Zealand English), bunker (Scottish English) is a raised, firm, flat, and horizontal surface. They are built for work in kitchens or other food preparation areas, bathrooms or lavatories, and workrooms in general. The surface is frequently installed upon and supported by cabinets, positioned at an ergonomic height for the user and the particular task for which it is designed. A countertop may be constructed of various materials with different attributes of functionality, durability and aesthetics, and may have built-in appliances, or accessory items relative to the intended application.

In Australian and British English, the term counter is generally reserved for a surface of this type that forms a boundary between a space for public access and a space for workers to carry out service tasks. In other contexts, the term bench, benchtop, or "sink table" is used.

== Kitchen countertops ==
The common fitted Western-style kitchen, developed in the early 20th century, is typically an arrangement of assembled unit cabinetry covered with a more-or-less continuous countertop work surface. The "unfitted" kitchen design style exemplified by Johnny Grey may also include detached and/or varied countertop surfaces mounted on discrete base support structures. Primary considerations of material choice and conformation are durability, functionality, hygienics, appearance, and cost.

When installed in a kitchen on standard (U.S) wall-mounted base unit cabinets, countertops are typically about 25–26 inches (640–660 millimetres) from front to back and are designed with a slight overhang on the front (leading) edge. This allows for a convenient reach to objects at the back of the countertop while protecting the base cabinet faces. It can also act as kick space that may not have been provided at the floor, allowing a person to stand closer to the countertop, improving ergonomics. In the UK the standard width is 600 mm (approximately 24 inches). Finished heights from the floor will vary depending on usage but typically will be 35–36 in (890–910 mm), with a material thickness depending on that chosen. They may include an integrated or applied backsplash (UK: upstand) to prevent spills and objects from falling behind the cabinets. Kitchen countertops may also be installed on freestanding islands, dining areas or bars, desk and table tops, and other specialized task areas; as before, they may incorporate cantilevers, free spans and overhangs depending on application. The horizontal surface and vertical edges of the countertop can be decorated in manners ranging from plain to very elaborate. They are often conformed to accommodate the installation of sinks, stoves (cookers), ranges, and cooktops, or other accessories such as dispensers, integrated drain boards, and cutting boards.

== Laboratory countertops ==
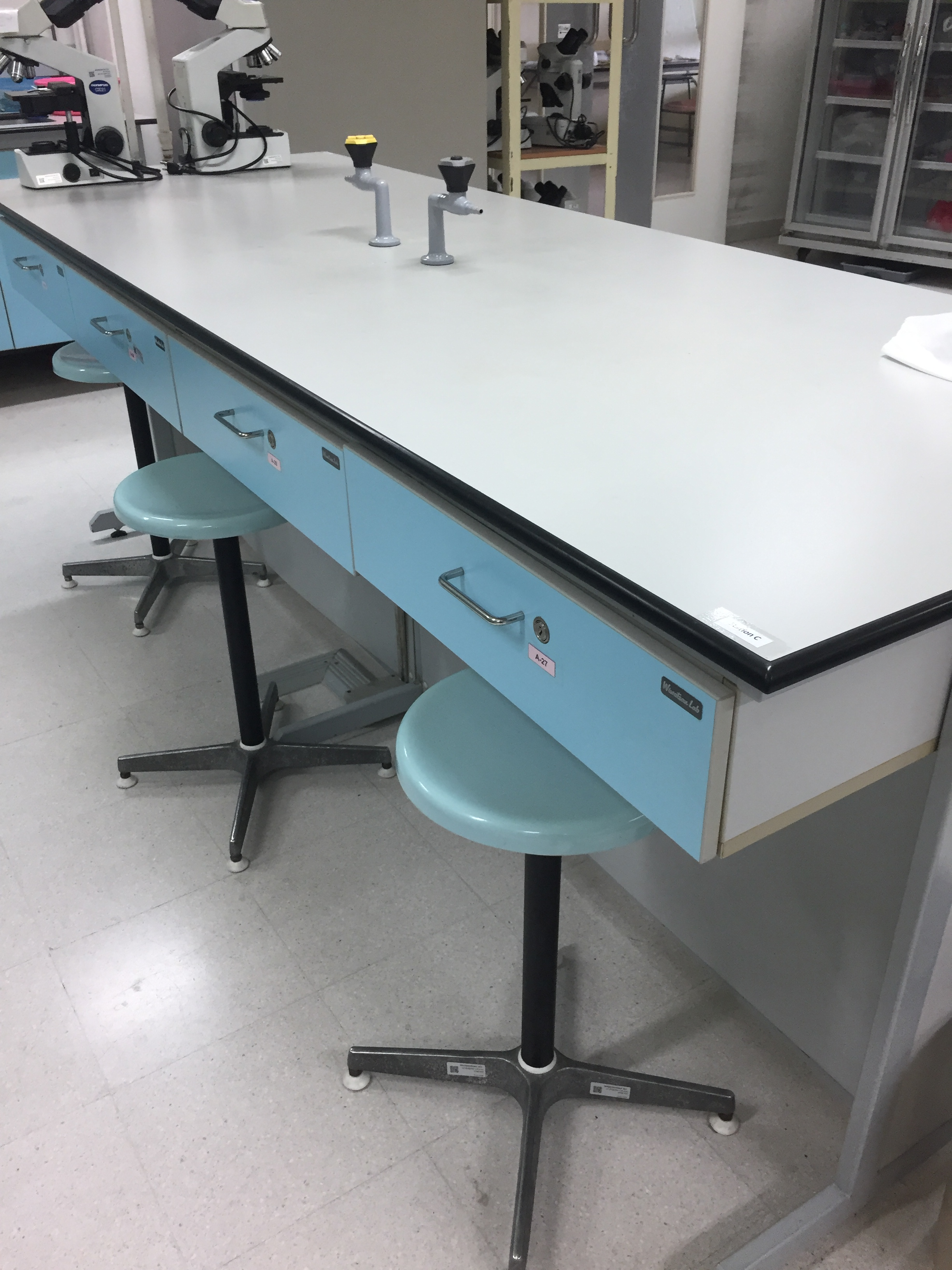
A lab countertop with drawers

Laboratory countertops are countertops used specifically in science fields for educational labs or research purposes. They can be used to place equipments, tools, projects and chemicals. Characteristics of laboratory countertops are generally determined according to what reagents or corrosive chemicals are being used. The purpose of the countertop would be different depending on whether it is used in a chemistry lab, physics lab, food science lab, microbiology or a biology lab. Common characteristics of preferred laboratory countertops are ones that are strong, durable, and water-, moisture- or chemical resistant. Depending on the objectives of a lab, they may additionally be required to be resistant to acids or high temperatures.

Many laboratory countertops are equipped with drawers that can be used to store materials that might get in the way while conducting an experiment. Materials such as lab notebooks, pencils, extra papers and folders are advised and expected to be stored away in the provided spaces or inside the drawer. The laboratory countertops' styles and variations may differ according to where they are (geographical location) and what labs they are being used for. They are also often made of different materials depending on their usage.

The most common and durable type of material used is phenolic resin because they are lightweight, strong, chemical and moisture resistant. It can handle heat exposure up to 350 °F (177 °C), beyond this temperature Epoxy Resin is used. Phenolic Resin and Epoxy Resin are both functionally equivalent, but differ in their heat handling abilities. Other materials to build laboratory countertops may include plastic laminate, stainless steel and even wood.

== Materials ==
Countertops can be made from a wide range of materials and the cost of the completed countertop can vary widely depending on the material chosen. The durability and ease of use of the material often rises with the increasing cost of the material but some costly materials are neither particularly durable nor user-friendly. Some common countertop materials are as follows:

- Natural stones
  - Granite
  - Limestone
  - Marble
  - Soapstone
  - Gabbro
  - Slate
  - Quartzite
- Silicate mineral
  - Travertine
  - Quartz
- Wood
  - Hardwood
  - Softwood
- Metals
  - Stainless steel
  - Copper
  - Zinc
  - Aluminium
- Crafted glass
- Manufactured materials
  - Concrete
    - Cast-in-place
    - Precast
    - Processed slabs
  - Compressed paper or fiber
  - Cultured marble
  - High-pressure laminates
    - Post-formed high-pressure decorative laminates
    - Self-edged high-pressure decorative laminates
  - Quartz surfacing or engineered stone is 99.9% solid @ 93% aggregate / 7% polyester resin (by weight), colors and binders
  - Recycled Glass surface either with concrete or polyester resin binders
  - Solid-surface acrylic plastic materials
  - Solid-surface polyester acrylic
  - Terrazzo
  - Tile
  - Cast-in-place materials
    - Natural stone suspended in a resin
    - Post-consumer glass suspended in a resin
  - Epoxy
  - Phenolic resin

=== Natural stone ===
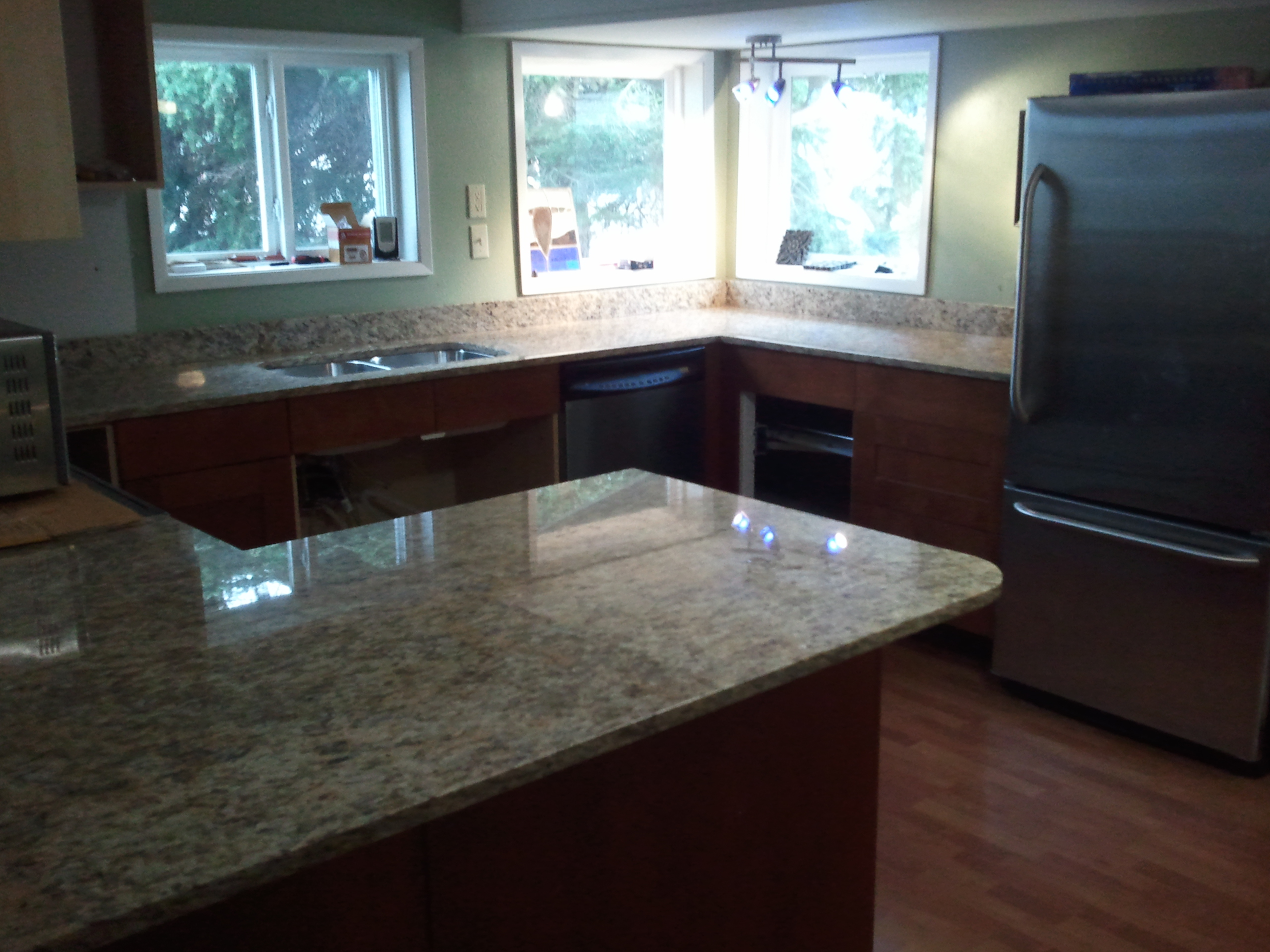
Kitchen stone countertops, USA

Natural stone is one of the most commonly used materials in countertops. Natural stone or dimension stone slabs (e.g. granite) are shaped using cutting and finishing equipment in the shop of the fabricator. The edges are commonly put on by hand-held routers, grinders, or CNC equipment. If the stone has a highly variegated pattern, the stone may be laid out in final position in the shop for the customer's inspection, or the stone slabs may be selected by experienced inspectors. Emerging technology allows for virtual stone placement on a computer. Exact photographs can now be taken which allow for the integration of a dxf file to lay on top of a stone image. Multiple slabs of material may be used in this layout process. Then the countertop assembly is installed on the job site by professionals. Commonly, initial countertop fabrication takes place at or near the quarry of origin, with blocks being sawn to thickness and then machined into standard widths (600mm and upwards), before being surface polished and edged. This method removes the need to ship waste material, and reduces the time needed to prepare client orders. This practice is called "cut to size" A wide range of details may be pre-machined by the fabricator, allowing for installation of different sinks and cooker designs. A common drawback to natural stone is the need for sealing to prevent harboring of bacteria and/or fluids that may cause staining. In recent years oleophobic impregnators have been introduced as an alternative to surface sealers. With the advent of impregnators the frequency of sealing has been cut down to once every five to ten years on most materials.

=== Wood ===
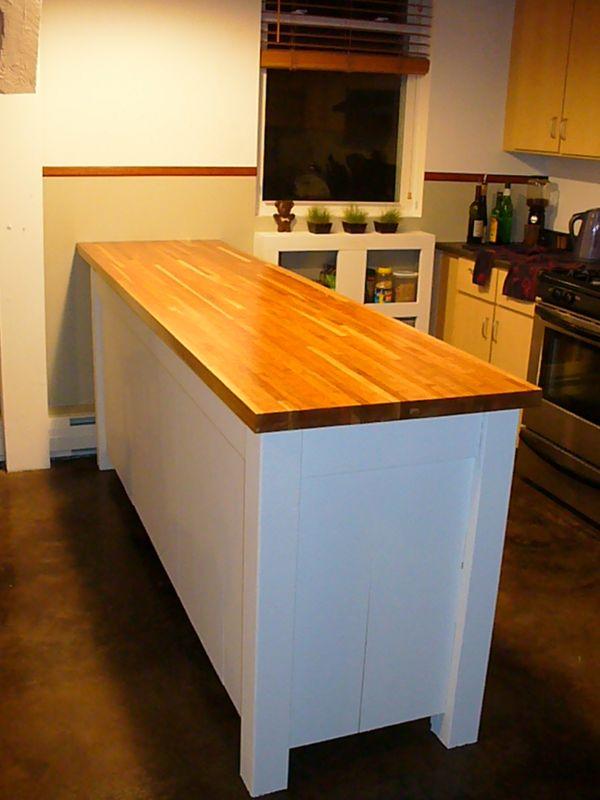
Butcher block counter top

Wooden countertops can come in a variety of designs ranging from butcher block to joined planks to single wide stave. Wood is considered to be the most eco-friendly option when it comes to choosing a kitchen countertop as wood is a renewable resource. Wood countertops must be thoroughly cleaned and disinfected after contact with foods such as raw meat. Although the use of wooden work surfaces is prohibited in commercial food production areas in the EU, and the US Department of Agriculture advises against the use of wooden chopping boards, research by the Food Research Institute at the University of Wisconsin has shown that wooden work surfaces are no more dangerous, and in some cases safer than plastic alternatives. They have shown that while bacteria do get absorbed by the wood, they do not multiply and eventually die. While brand new plastic work surfaces are indeed easy to disinfect, once they have become heavily knife scarred they are nearly impossible to completely disinfect. This is not a problem with wooden work surfaces where the number of knife cuts made little difference.

=== High-pressure laminates ===
==== Post-formed plastic laminate ====
"Post-formed" (or literally "formed after being laminated" to the substrate) high pressure laminate countertop, often referred to as "plastic laminate countertop" is a material made more of wood product than plastic. The composition is of kraft paper, decorative papers, and melamine resins, bonded through high heat and pressure. This product is sometimes referred to as Formica or Arborite, but these are trade names of a manufactured high pressure laminate, of which there are many manufacturers.

The postform countertop is typically a high volume factory-produced product, which accounts for the economy of the product. The material composition consists of a single thin sheet of laminate (typically .030" - .040" in thickness) that gets bonded to a 45# density particle board substrate (or other similar base material such as MDF - medium density fiberboard, or plywood), with a PVA adhesive (poly vinyl acetate - a water-based adhesive). Traditionally postform countertops were manufactured with a solvent-based contact cement (a highly flammable, volatile organic compound - VOC). However, in today's marketplace PVA adhesives have taken over for reasons of environmental responsibility (no VOC's), safety (non-combustible), economy, and strength of the glue line.

A typical system consists of the following:

1. An automated infeed system for sequencing the particle board into production.
2. The CorFab Machine, an automated feed-through machine that cuts to size, cuts and bonds build down sticks with a hot-melt adhesive to the under side of the substrate, and shapes the edge detail, all in a single motion.
3. An automated laminating system that applies the adhesive to both the substrate and laminate.
4. An indexing unit that aligns the laminate to the substrate with the proper overhang.
5. A Pinch Roller that makes the bond between the laminate and substrate.
6. The Postforming Machine, that not only heats and forms the laminate around the substrate, but also cuts away the backsplash (when the top is to be used against a wall) from the main deck, all in a feed-through motion machine.
7. The AutoCove Machine, which heats and forms the backsplash upward 90 degrees, locking it into place with what is referred to as a cove stick, utilizing hot melt adhesive technology to hold it all together.
8. The final stage of the system usually consists of a trim saw that cuts the countertops to rough lengths, typically 8', 10' and 12', ready for distribution.

Once manufactured the tops need only to be cut to length, mitered, fitted for assembly, and end capped (only if it is a visible finished end). A very specific machine for cutting the postform countertop is manufactured by only a few companies, it is commonly called a Cutting Station, Top Saw, or simply Miter Saw. This machine accurately cuts the countertop to field dimensions, making it easy for the installer to make the final scribe cuts on-site to complete the work. Sink cut outs can be made either in the field or at the installers shop.

Overall, the postform countertop is the most economical countertop on the market, and has the broadest selection of surface material to choose from. Surfaces can be either a solid color, or a pattern, and textures range from a satin furniture finish to a heavily textured stone or pebbled appearance to a high gloss resolution. Because of this diversity, the postform countertop can satisfy a wide variety of design applications, and due to its economy, it can be easily replaced to provide a fresh appearance in any room.

==== Self edge or wood edge laminate ====
Self or wood edge plastic laminate countertops are also very popular for those who chose to have few or no surface seams. In this style, the top shop uses substrate for the countertop out of MDF, or particle board and then glue sheets of laminate to the substrate using Contact Cement. The laminate is then trimmed using a router. This method can't reproduce the curved contours of post-formed countertopping but can be made to easily conform to a much-wider range of floor plans with fewer seams.

=== Crafted glass ===
Custom architectural crafted glass, tempered glass, textured glass pieces, and the ancient art of verre églomisé, or reverse gilded glass, are applied to contemporary uses including countertops, backsplashes, and tabletops. Glass work may be customized to suit by craftsmen in the studio, then installed on site either in small components (such as a kitchen countertop composed of three rectangles of verre églomisé) or as immense, single units (for example, a glass countertop and sink basin formed of one continuous piece of textured glass). Surface texture comes in several variations, such as sanded, melted, pixels, and linear. Glass countertops also often have customized edges, including: bushed polished, textured, and fire polished edges. The glass is non-porous, relatively stain-proof, extremely hygienic, and "extremely heat resistant (up to 700 degrees)." Much work is being done to "recycle" glass using sources such as post consumer glass or post industrial float glass. The material can be crushed or cut into strips that is heated until the softening point of glass, binding the loose material back into a solid form.

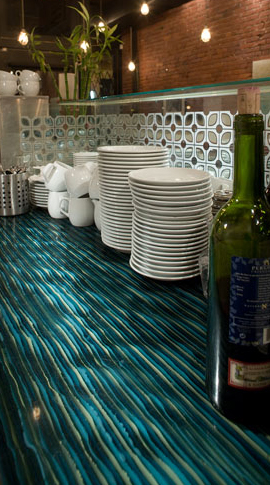
Ribbons of colored glass fused into a solid slab

=== Tile ===
Tile, including ceramic tile and stone tile, is installed in much the same way as floor tiles or wall tiles through the use of mortar and grouting the tile gaps after they have been cemented down. The tiles that sit on the wall typically behind a countertop are called a backsplash.

=== Solid surface materials ===
Solid surface acrylic or polyester materials are usually prefabricated at the installer's shop and then assembled on site. The material is readily glued and the glue joints are then sanded, leaving almost no visible trace of the joint. The edge treatment for solid-surface countertops can be very elaborate. The material itself is usually only about 12 mm (1/2 in) thick so an edge is usually created by stacking up two or three layers of the material. The built-up edge then can be shaped to a rounded edge or an ogee. Fancier edge treatments are more expensive.

=== Engineered quartz surfacing ===
Engineered stone quartz surfacing is made from a mixture of ground quartz and resins. Testing has shown that they retain much of the toughness of quartz but display increased ductility due to the resin, improving impact resistance. Tests also have shown that this countertop surface is the most resistant to discoloration from foods and household products among common household surfaces, the second most stain resistant being granite. Countertops are custom made and more scratch resistant as well as less porous than natural quartz surfaces, and don't need to be sealed like other stone surfaces. Due to the presence of the resins, quartz counters are less prone to staining. Thicknesses may be 6mm, 1.2 cm (1/2 inch), 2 cm (3/4 inch), 3 cm (1¼ inch) or 4 cm (1½ inch).

=== Concrete ===
Concrete may be utilized as a surfacing material in one of several forms: cast-in-place (in which the fabricator creates forms atop the previously installed cabinetry, places, and then finishes the material in situ), custom precast (in which the fabricator creates site templates, duplicates the pattern in a production facility offsite, and installs the finished product atop the cabinetry), and the machining of pre-manufactured gauged slabs (similar to natural stone fabrication).

Concrete, especially precast, lends itself to a high degree of customization due to the phase-change nature of its creation, filling a specific form with a fluid material which hardens (through mineral hydration) to a durable cast stone. Color choices, edge styles, three-dimensional sculpting, and integral features such as sinks, drainboards, and decorative embedments are design options which may be incorporated. Due to its site-specific and generally handmade nature, concrete countertops are often produced by small shops and individual artisans although there are several large-scale manufacturers of gauged slabs.

=== Cultured marble ===
Cultured marble countertops are man made vanity tops that have the appearance of and resemble real stone marble. Cultured marble countertops are made by mixing high strength polyester resin and real marble stone dust. The combination is then formulated with additional chemicals and poured into a cast mold. These molds can ultimately produce bathtubs, whirlpool decks, shower pans, window sills, and even vanity tops. The finished material is significantly less expensive than natural marble and four times stronger than natural stones such as granite or marble. The process of using a mold also allows the fabricated countertops to have features such as different surface textures and a vast array of colors which natural stone can not. Cultured marble countertops are aesthetically pleasing and a more economical and durable alternative to real stone marble.

=== Paper composites ===
Paper composite panels fabricated from paper and resin laminated under heat and pressure to form a solid, dense material have been used as countertops in residences and science labs since the 1950s.

=== Other materials ===
Stainless steel, stone, terrazzo, bamboo, and other materials are usually prefabricated and assembled on site as well. The difficulty of prefabrication rises with the more exotic materials. As with solid-surface synthetic materials, the edge treatments can vary widely, but the material is usually thicker so there is often no need to build up the edge with multiple layers of the material.

Many predesigned, prefabricated units (including sinks, drainboards, and other accessories) are available in stainless steel. These may be used "stand-alone" or integrated into larger custom assemblies. Some stainless steel systems stand on integrated legs and do not require the support of cabinetry.

== Sink installation ==
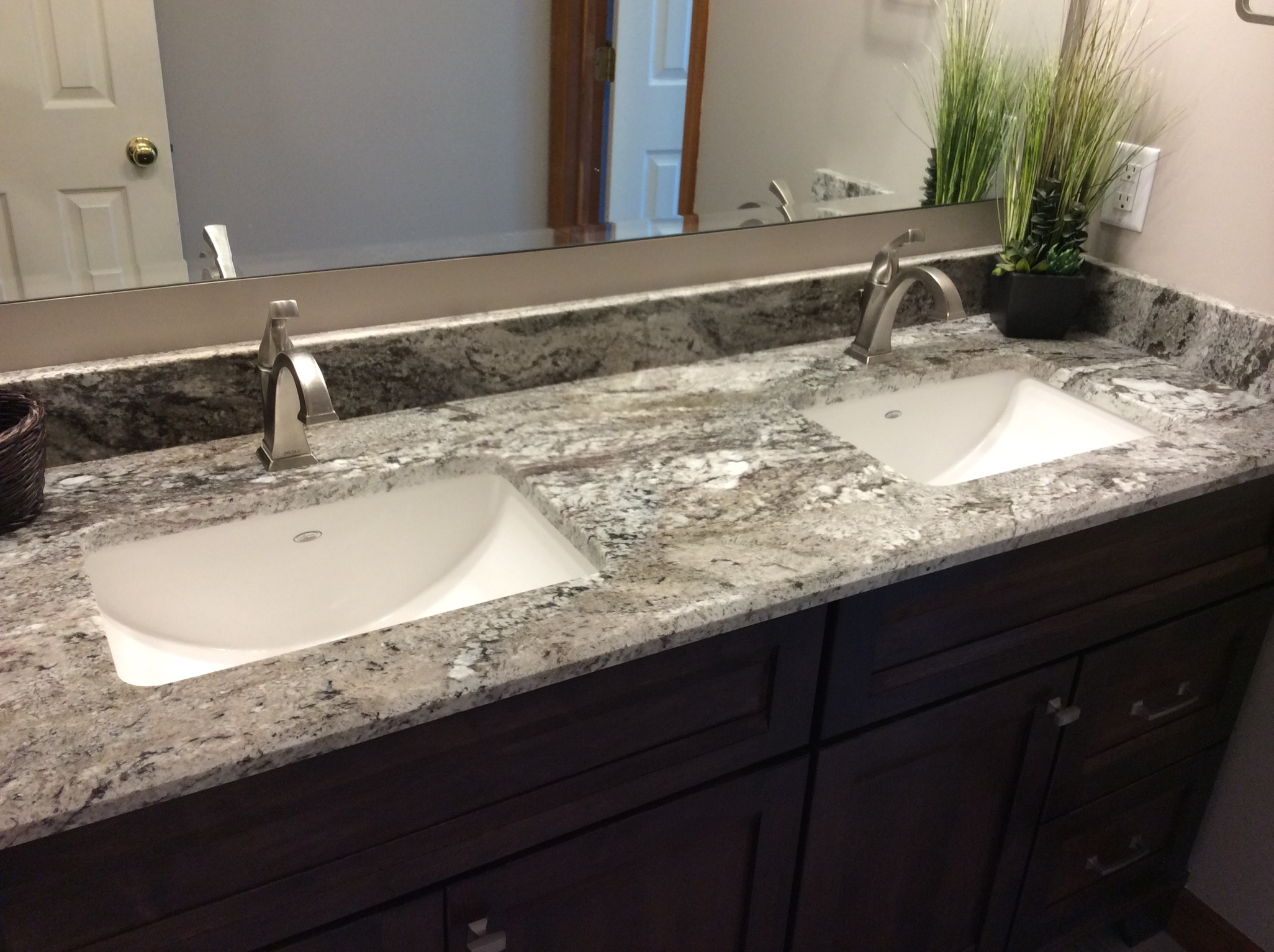
A modern, granite bathroom countertop with sinks, USA

In any of these styles, "self-rimming" sinks can be used. They are mounted in templated holes cut in the countertop (or substrate material) using a jigsaw or other cutter appropriate to the material at hand and are suspended by their rim. The rim forms a close fit, reinforced with a sealant, on the top surface of the countertop, especially when the sink is clamped into the hole from below.

Most materials also allow the installation of a "bottom-mount" or "under-mount" sink. With these, the edge of the countertop material is exposed at the hole created for the sink (and so must be a carefully finished edge rather than a rough cut; this cut is generally done at the fabricator's workshop). The sink is then mounted to the bottom of the material from below. Especially for under-mount sinks, silicone-based sealants are typically used to assure a waterproof joint between the sink and the countertop material. The advantage of an "under-mount" sink is that it gives a contemporary look to the kitchen but the disadvantages are extra cost in both the sink and the counter top.

Solid-surface plastic materials allow a third option: sinks made of the same plastic material as the countertop can easily be glued to the underside of the countertop material and the joint sanded flat, creating the usual invisible joint and eliminating any dirt-catching seam between the sink and the countertop. The disadvantage is that the sinks do not have the same impact resistance of stainless or cast iron and may differentially expand and contract with extreme temperature change (as might be caused by a pot of hot water dumped into the sink). In a similar fashion, with stainless steel, a sink may be welded into the countertop; the joint is then ground to create a finished, concealed appearance.

== See also ==
- Backsplash (interior), protection for walls above a work surface where splashes may occur, like kitchens or bathrooms
- Bar (counter)
