= Hinge (disambiguation) =

A hinge is a mechanical bearing that connects two solid objects.

Hinge or hinges can also refer to:

== Arts, entertainment, and media ==
- Hinge, former name of the band Dry Kill Logic
- "Hinge I" and "Hinge II", tracks on If You Saw Thro' My Eyes album by Iain Matthews
- .hinge, mid-2000's Australian 'Alternative Metal' band, from Melbourne, who released two albums

== Science and mathematics ==
- Hinge joint (ginglymus), a bone joint
- Hinge line of bivalve shells
- Hinge teeth of bivalve shells
- Ligament (bivalve) or hinge ligament of a bivalve shell
- Molecular hinge, a molecule that can be selectively switched from one configuration to another in a reversible fashion
- Hinge functions in multivariate statistics
- Hinge theorem in geometry
- Hinge decomposition of hypergraphs, used when studying constraint satisfaction problems

== People ==
- See Hinge (surname)
- Hinge and Bracket, stage personae

== Places ==
- Hinges, Pas-de-Calais, a place in France

== Types of hinge ==
- Floating hinge, a type of hinge that enables one of the objects to move away from the other
- Geared continuous hinge, a type of continuous hinge
- Living hinge, a thin flexible hinge made from the same material as the two rigid pieces it connects
- Plastic hinge in structural engineering beam theory
- Stamp hinge in philately

== Other uses ==
- Hinge (app), a dating app
- Hinge Studios in California
- Jonbar hinge in science-fiction criticism

== See also ==
- Hing (disambiguation)
- Unhinged (disambiguation)
- Hinge loss in machine learning
- Hinge pearl, a type of imitation pearl
- Hinge-action, or break-action, in firearms
- Hell's Hinges, silent film
- The Crooked Hinge, novel
- Pressure the Hinges, album by Haste the Day
- Kinixys, genus of hinge-back tortoises
