= Qingyan (disambiguation) =

Qingyan (Chinese: 青岩镇) is a town in Huaxi, Guiyang, Guizhou, China.

Qingyan, Qing-Yan, or, variation, may also refer to:

== People ==
=== Given name "Qingyan", "Qing-yan" ===
- Qingyan "Yan" Chen, Chinese-Hongkonger-American engineer
- Chén Qìngyán (born 1940; Chinese: 陈庆炎), Singaporean politician
- Liu Qingyan, winner of the 2013 children's show host award at the 48th Golden Bell Awards
- Wu Qingyan (Chinese: 吴庆沿), Chinese politician at the 11th National People's Congress of China; see List of members of the 11th National People's Congress
- Yang Qingyan, 1667 builder of Jin Garden

=== Given name "Qing" surnamed "Yan" ===
Fictional characters

- Yan Qing (Chinese: 燕青; western name order: Qing Yan), a fictional character in Water Margin

== Places ==
- Qing Yan Garden (Chinese: 清晏园), a classical garden in Huai'an City, Jiangsu Province, China
- Tianzi Mountain (also known as "Qingyan Mountain"), a mountain in Zhangjiajie, Hunan, China
- Qingyan Village, Shimashan Town, Lianyuan, Loudi City, Hunan Province, China
- Qingyan Subdistrict (Chinese: 青阳街道), Rong County, Zigong, Sichuan, China; see List of township-level divisions of Sichuan

== Other uses ==
- Qing Yan Fang (Chinese: 清晏舫), a stone boat at the Summer Palace, Beijing, China

== See also ==
- The Legend of Qing Yan (Chinese: 青颜传), a 2021 teledrama; see List of Kuaishou original programming
- Yanqing (disambiguation), including "Yan Qing"
- Qing (disambiguation)
- Yan (disambiguation)
