= Yanqing =

Yanqing may refer to:

- Yanqing District (formerly Yanqing County), in Beijing, China
  - Yanqing (town), a subdivision of Yanqing District
  - Jiuxian, a main settlement of Yanqing County until 1316
- Yanqing Temple, near Wutaishan, Shanxi province
- Yan Qing (Chinese: 燕青), a fictional character in Water Margin

== See also ==
- Yanjin (disambiguation)
- Yanjing (disambiguation)
- Qingyan (disambiguation), including Qing Yan
- Qing (disambiguation)
- Yan (disambiguation)
