= Carpentier (disambiguation) =

Carpentier is a surname.

Carpentier may also refer to:

- Carpentier joint
- Carpentier River
- Carpentier, Port-Salut, Haiti, a village in the Sud department of Haiti.
