= Hing =

Hing may refer to:

- Asafoetida, a spice derived from the plant Ferula assa-foetida
- Hing (surname)

People with the given name Hing include:

- Hing Tong (1922–2007), American mathematician
- Lew Hing (1858–1934), American businessman

== See also ==
- Donald Hings (1907–2004), Canadian inventor
- John Hings (1910–1999), English cricketer
- Hinge (disambiguation)
