= Squeaky hinge =

Squeaky hinges produce a squeaking or rasping noise when they are moved. Sounds can differ when opened or closed.

Lubrication fixes this. Suitable lubricants include plumber's grease and silicone spray. Oil is not so suitable as it can drip off when in excess. Graphite is also unsuitable as it spreads to other surfaces and makes a mess. To give complete coverage of lubricant, the hinge pin is removed to be covered in the lubricant, and then reinserted. Oiling a squeaky hinge is considered a masculine behaviour.

Some hinges are designed not to squeak.

Chinese hinges may be designed to make sounds like a spoken word.

Simulation of the sound of a squeaking hinge is important in virtual reality or games. The friction can be modeled using the bristle model, and the sound produced via an exciter-resonator model.
