= Hinge (surname) =

Hinge is a surname. Notable people with the surname include:

- John Hinge (born 1986), Australian rules footballer
- Mitch Hinge (born 1998), Australian rules footballer
- Mike Hinge (1931–2003), New Zealand-born artist and illustrator
- Neha Hinge, Indian model
- Onkar Hinge, Doctor

== See also ==
- Hinge and Bracket
- Hinge (disambiguation)
