= Yanjin =

Yanjin may refer to the following locations:

- Yanjin County, Henan (延津县), under the administration of Xinxiang, Henan, China
- Yanjin County, Yunnan (盐津县), under the administration of Zhaotong, Yunnan, China

== See also ==
- Yanjing (disambiguation)
- Yanqing (disambiguation)
