= Hinge bender =

Hand tool for adjusting hinges

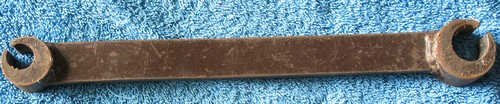
Hinge bender.

A hinge bender, also called a hinge tweaker or hinge adjuster, is a hand tool for adjusting hinges, for instance on doors and windows on buildings, or on cars.

== Purpose ==
A hinge bender can be used to straighten a door that is tilted sideways relative to the door frame, which tends to happen gradually with most doors over a long time period. According to the Norwegian Standard NS 3424, it is expected that a house door needs adjustment every 2 to 8 years. Tilted doors can be especially noticeable during the winter time, as doors tend to expand due to changes in humidity of the air.

== Operation ==
The hinge bender is used by placing it onto the hinge and twisting the tool in the direction that one wishes to adjust the door panel. It is important to turn the bender in the right direction. The tool is placed onto the hinge from the top while the door is closed. By rotating the hinge bender towards the door, the opening between the hinge stile and casing is decreased. If the tool instead is rotated away from the door, the opening between the hinge stile and casing will be increased.

Pulling with too much force can break the hinge or strip the screw heads of the hinge. Hinge benders can have either adjustable or fixed openings in order to fit different types of hinges.

== Different types and dimensions ==
Hinge dimensions, and thus corresponding hinge bender size, vary with types of doors and between different regions. Some common diameters for fixed-opening hinge benders in Europe are 14 and 17 mm (0.55 and 0.67 in). In the United States, 0.134 and 0.180 gauge hinges are common, which have barrel diameters of 3/4 and 13/16 in (19 and 21 mm). In Australia, some common hinge barrel diameters are 12 and 15 mm (0.47 and 0.59 in).

Adjustable hinge benders are also available to accommodate different hinge sizes.

== See also ==
- Jamb
- Wood chisel
