= Yanjing (disambiguation) =

Yanjing (燕京 yànjīng) is an archaic name for Jicheng, the ancient capital of the State of Yan, located in modern-day Central Beijing.

Yanjing may also refer to:

- An alternative name for Nanjing, the name for Beijing during the Liao dynasty (907–1125)
- Beijing Yanjing Brewery, which manufactures Yanjing Beer
- Yanjing, Li County (盐井镇), a town in Li County, Hunan Province, China

== See also ==
- Yanjin (disambiguation)
- Yanqing (disambiguation)
