= Unhinged =

Unhinged may refer to:

- Unhinged (album), a 1993 album by Roy Harper
- Unhinged (book), a 2018 political book by Omarosa Manigault Newman
- Unhinged (1982 film), a 1982 American horror film
- Unhinged (2020 film), a 2020 American thriller film
- Unhinged (Magic: The Gathering), a 2004 expansion set for Magic: The Gathering
- Trivial Pursuit: Unhinged, a 2004 video game
- Unhinged: Exposing Liberals Gone Wild, a 2005 political book by Michelle Malkin
- Unhinged, a 2016 song by Nick Jonas from Last Year Was Complicated
- Unhinged, a 2026 video game developed by Night School Studio

== See also ==
- Hinge (disambiguation)
