= Hing (surname) =

Hing is an English surname, as well as a spelling of various Chinese surnames based on their Southern Min or Cantonese pronunciations.

== Origins ==
The English surname Hing is probably a variant of Ing, with a prothetic /h/ added at the beginning. Other similar variants include Hynge and Henge. According to the International Genealogical Index of the Church of Jesus Christ of Latter-day Saints, the spelling Hynge is recorded as early as 1541 in Croydon, while there are various records of the spelling Hing throughout the 17th century in London and Kent. The English surname Ing originated both as a toponymic surname from the district of Ing in Essex (whose name is preserved in various places there such as Ingrave and Ingatestone), and from the Old Norse given name Inga.

Hing is also a spelling, based on pronunciations in different varieties of Chinese, of the following Chinese surnames, listed below based on their romanisation in Hanyu Pinyin (which reflects the Mandarin Chinese pronunciation):

- Qīng (Chinese: 卿), spelled Hing based on its Standard Cantonese pronunciation (Jyutping: Hing1; Cantonese Yale: Hīng)
- Wáng (Chinese: 王), spelled Hing based on its Teochew pronunciation (Peng'im: Hêng^{5})
- Xíng (Chinese: 邢), spelled Hing based on its Hokkien pronunciation (Pe̍h-ōe-jī: Heng)
- Xìng (Chinese: 幸), spelled Hing based on its pronunciations in various Southern Min dialects, including Hokkien (Pe̍h-ōe-jī: Hēng) and Teochew (Peng'im: Hêng^{6})

There is also a Cambodian surname Hing (Khmer: ហ៊ីង).

== Statistics ==
Statistics compiled by Patrick Hanks on the basis of the 2011 United Kingdom census and the Census of Ireland 2011 found 343 people with the surname Hing on the island of Great Britain and none on the island of Ireland. In the 1881 United Kingdom census there were 186 bearers of the surname, primarily at Kent. The 2010 United States census found 980 people with the surname Hing, making it the 25,272nd-most-common surname in the country. This represented a decrease from 1,226 people (20,204th-most-common) in the 2000 census. In the 2000 US census, about 30% of the bearers of the surname identified as non-Hispanic white, 12% as non-Hispanic black, and 44% as Asian or Pacific Islander; in the 2010 US census, these proportions had changed to 16%, 6%, and 64% respectively.

== People ==
- Leah Hing (1907–2001), first Chinese-American woman to earn a pilot's license
- Alex Hing (born 1946), one of the leaders of the Red Guard Party, a radical Chinese-American organization founded in 1969
- Hing Bun Hieng (born 1957), Cambodian general
- Abigail Hing Wen (邢立美, born 1977), American novelist of Chinese Indonesian descent
- Michael Hing (born 1985), Australian comedian

== See also ==
- Hing (disambiguation)
- Qing (disambiguation)
