= Geared continuous hinge =

Type of continuous hinge used mostly on doors in high-traffic entrances

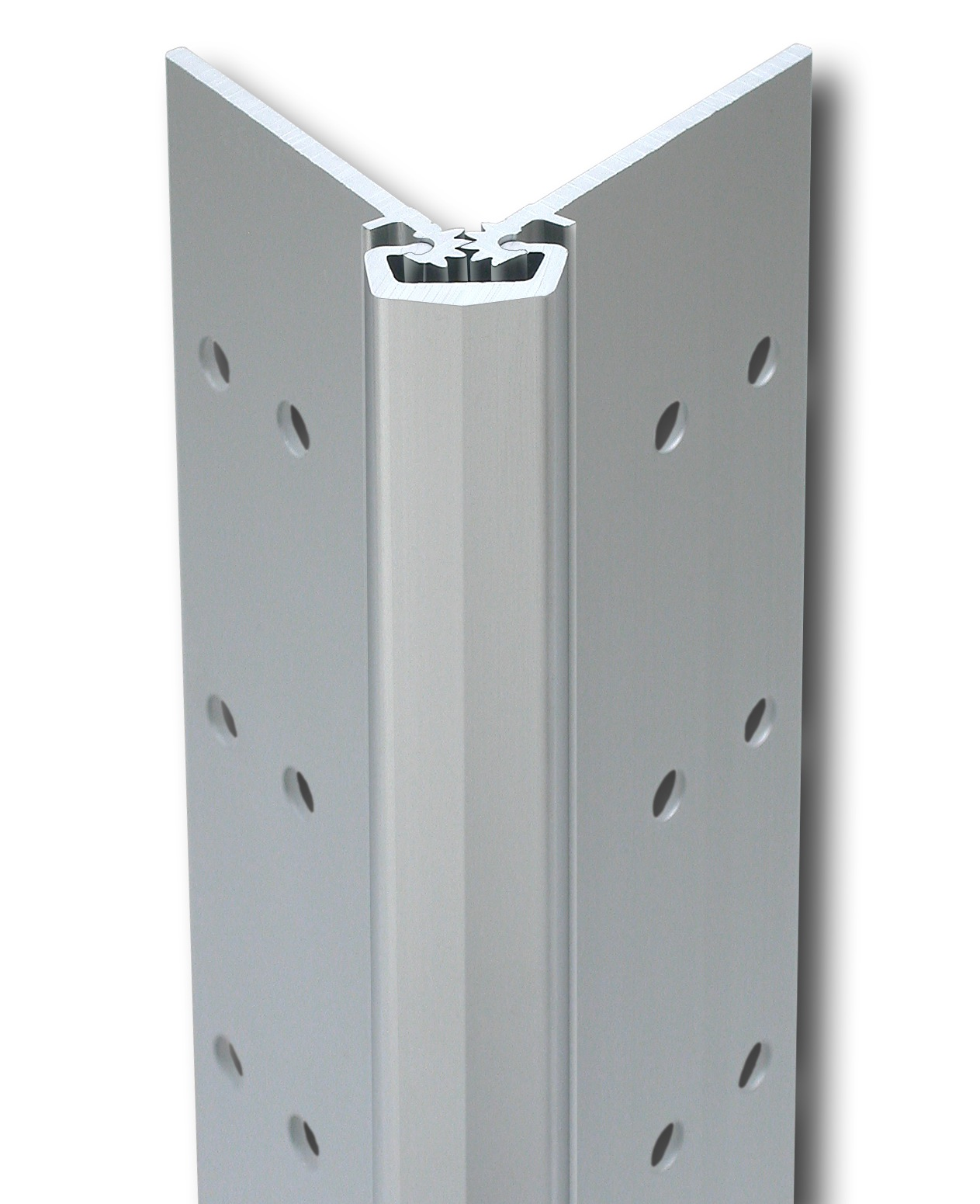
Geared continuous hinge

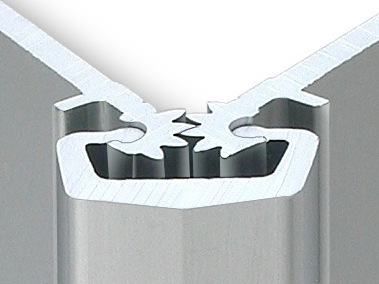
detail of the above picture

A geared continuous hinge is a type of continuous hinge used mostly on doors in high-traffic entrances and features gear teeth that mesh together under a cap that runs the length of the hinge. The hinges use a number of fasteners to attach the door to the frame from top to bottom to distribute a door’s weight more evenly along the frame to stop doors from sagging. They are often used in schools, hospitals, hotels, offices, airports, stadiums, storefronts and many other commercial and industrial buildings.

They are generally made from extruded architectural aluminum and most are anodized to resist corrosion (common colors include black, bronze and clear). To meet building fire codes, they can be made with up to a three-hour fire rating.

== Styles ==
Geared continuous hinges are available in several styles, including concealed, full surface (mortise), half surface (mortise), swing clear and toilet partition models for new construction and retrofit applications.

== History ==
In 1963 Austin Baer, an MIT-trained engineer, earned a patent for his design of hinge leaves with intermeshed gears. In 1968, he earned a second patent for adding thrust bearings to the original design. All geared hinges today are based on this design, which distributes the door’s weight over the entire door length rather than concentrated on two or three spots as with butt or pivot hinges. The gears allowed fluid movement as the door opened and closed.

Baer's patent expired in 1985. He sold his company to a national manufacturer in 1989. With the sale, and with other companies beginning to manufacture geared continuous hinges, the market soon went from regional to national.

Later the hinges were tested to verify their endurance. In 2004, a geared continuous hinge earned 60 minute Ballistic Resistance and Forced Entry certification from the United States Department of State for use in its embassies overseas. In 2005, a geared continuous hinge surpassed 25 million open/close cycles in the ANSI (American National Standards Institute) Physical Endurance Swing Test at Architectural Testing, Inc. in St. Paul, Minn.

Geared continuous hinges are produced by several commercial hardware manufacturers in the United States.

== See also ==
- Door – Movable barrier that allows ingress and egress
- Hinge – Mechanical bearing connecting two objects
