= Jin Garden =

Garden in Changzhou, China

Coordinates: 31.782094°N 119.95892°E

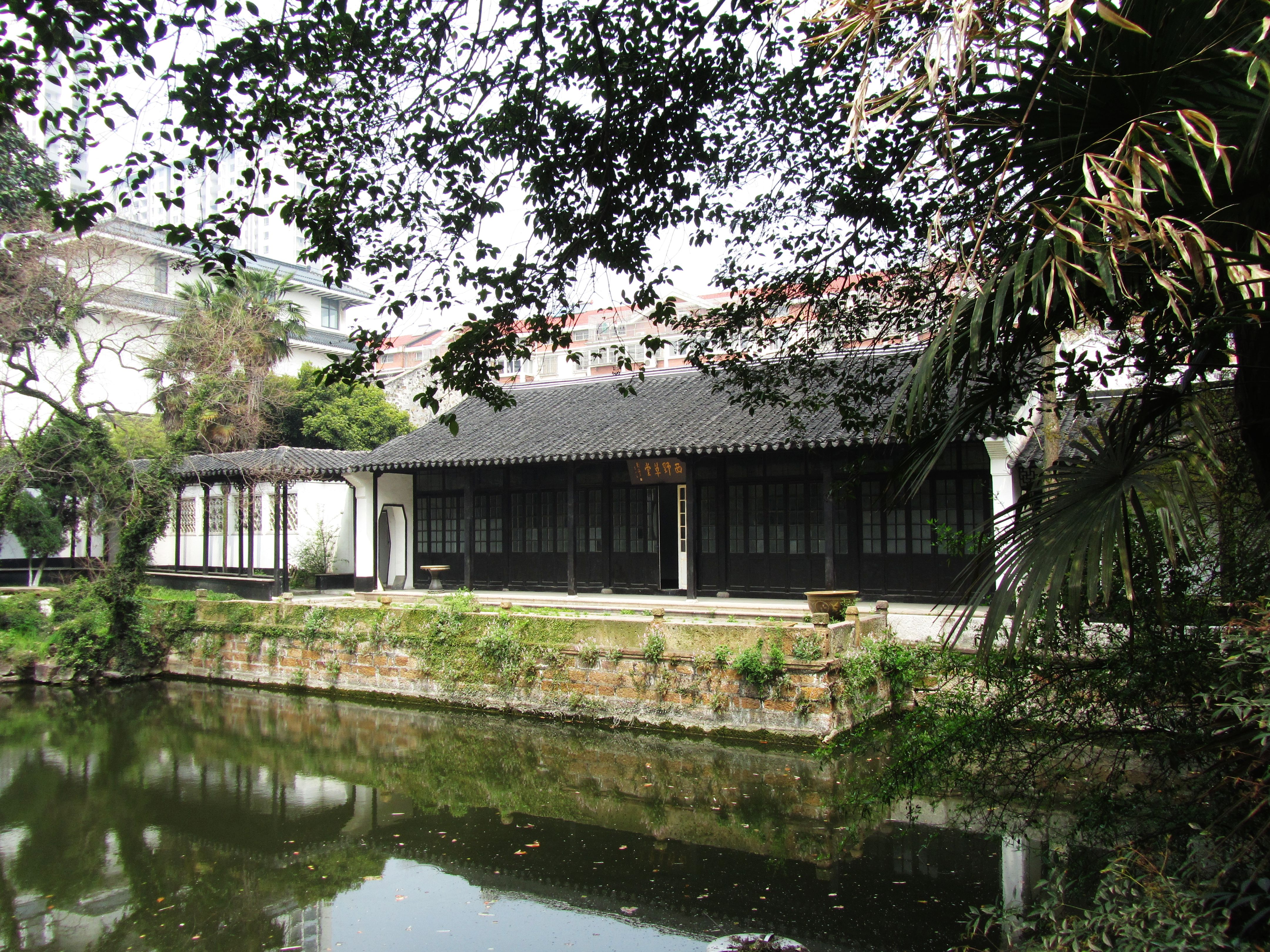
Jin Garden

Jin Garden (Chinese: 近园; simplified Chinese: 近园; traditional Chinese: 近園) is a traditional Chinese garden in Changzhou.

In 1667, Yang Qingyan built it. In 2013, it was listed as a Major Historical and Cultural Site Protected at the National Level.

The garden covers an area of about 4600 square meters, with its layout basically the same as the garden in ancient times. Its dimensions are 80 meters from north to south, and 64 meters from east to west.
