= Carpentier joint =

Hinge consisting of thin spring metal strips of curved cross section

A carpentier joint is a hinge consisting of several thin metal strips of curved cross section, similar in structure to retracting steel measuring tape, or some retractable radio antennas. It has two configurations: closed and open. The defining property of the joint is that it is self-opening, does not need mechanical elements such as guides, and maintains a certain degree of stiffness when in the open configuration.

The hinge is used in antenna deployment, solar arrays and sensor deployment in satellite applications.

The hinge locks in the open condition. To fold, the spring strips are subjected to sufficient bending moment to pop the curved section of each strip flat in the centre, and flex along the length from the centre in an elastic curve to the desired angle, where it must be held in place until it is to be deployed. Release of the restraining force allows the elasticity of the material and the stored energy of bending to restore the strips to straight configuration, at which point the sectional curve will pop back and lock the strip straight. Depending on the length of the spring strips and the width of the end-pieces, the hinge may be folded to angles in the order of 180° The entire folding motion is provided by elastic deformation of the strips, there is no sliding contact surface.
