= Floating hinge =

Type of hinge that allows rotation and some linear movement

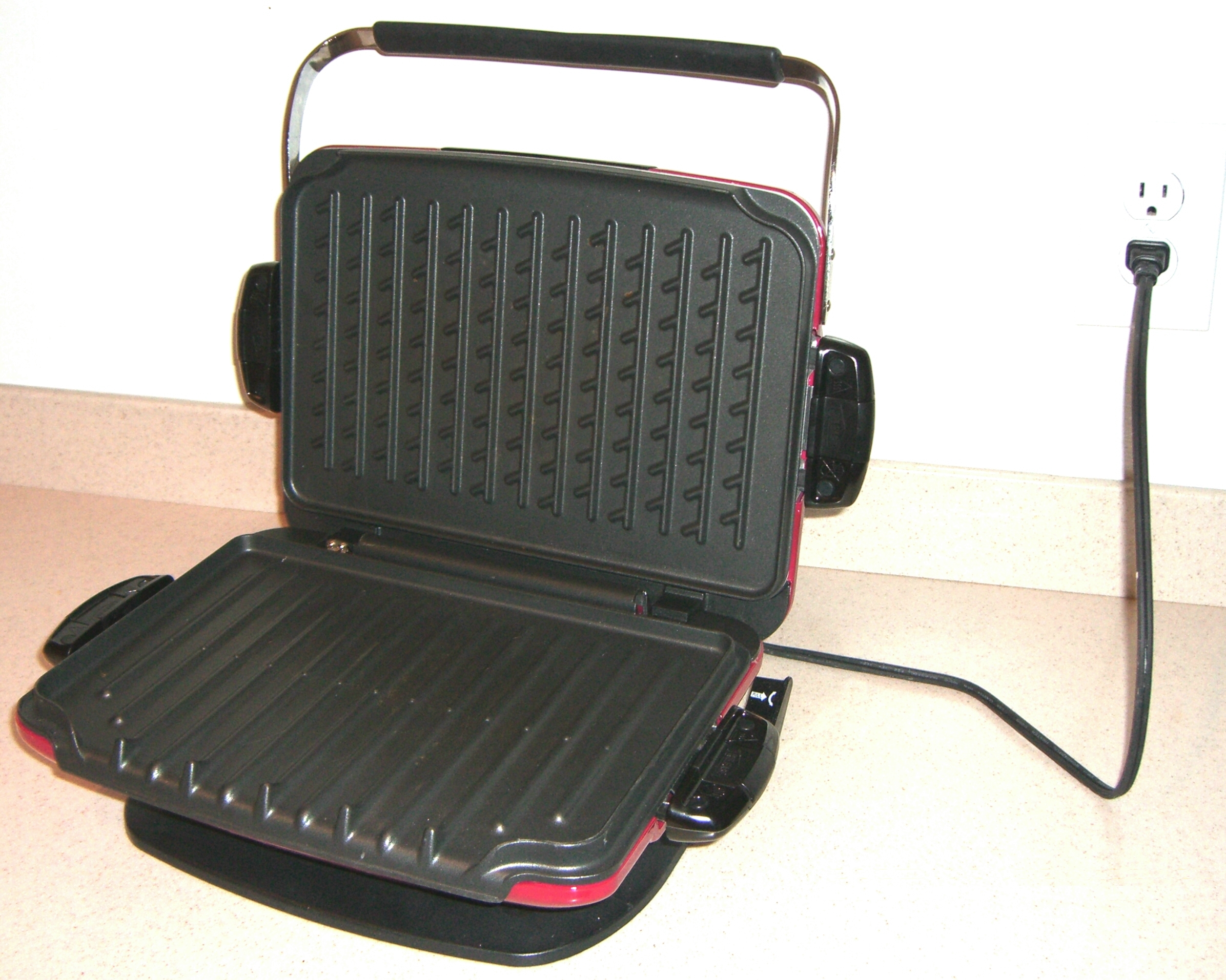
Cooking grill with floating hinge

A floating hinge is a hinge that, while able to behave as a normal hinge, enables one of the objects to move away from the other - hence "float". In effect, the hinge allows for two parallel axes of rotation – one for each object joined by the hinge – and each axis can be moved relative to the position of the other.

== Uses ==
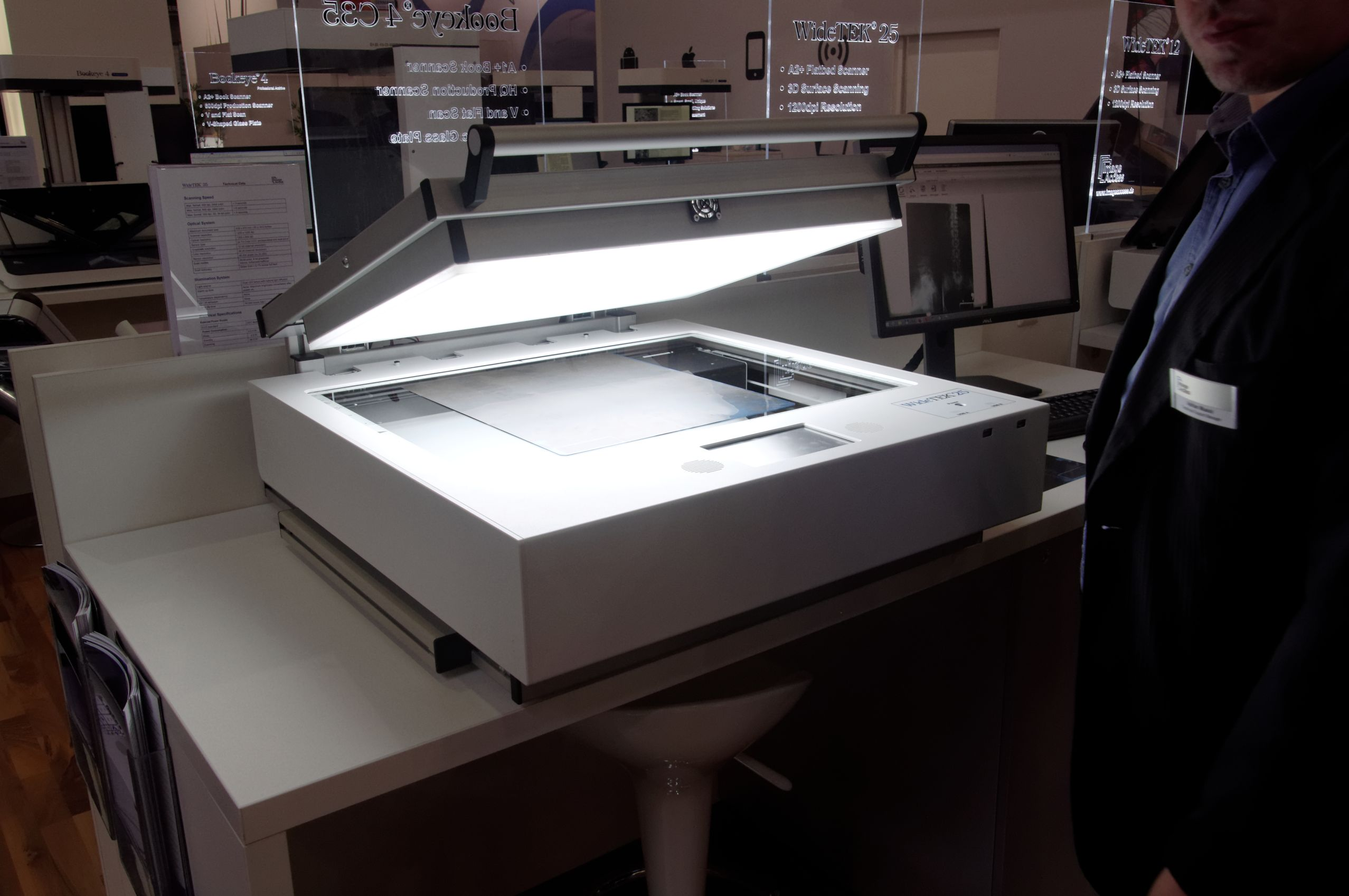
Book scanner with floating hinge

Floating hinges are used in flatbed scanners designed to scan thick objects such as books. If a regular sheet of paper is placed on the glass and the cover is lowered over it, the glass, the paper, and the cover are very close together. If a thicker object is placed on the glass, an ordinary hinge would leave the cover at an angle to the glass; a floating hinge raises the hinged edge of the cover to the level of the book so that the cover remains parallel to the glass, but raised above it.

Floating hinges are also used in two-plate electric cooking grills, as they allow for even heating of both sides of a thick piece of food without crushing it.

== See also ==
- Concealed hinge jig – Support and locating tool for drilling recess holes to mount concealed hinges
- Hinge – Mechanical bearing connecting two objects
