= Yahn =

Yahn يهن
- Village
- Location within Iran
- Coordinates: 33°08′59″N 59°21′38″E
- Country: Iran
- Province: South Khorasan
- County: Birjand
- Bakhsh: Central
- Rural District: Alqurat

Population (2006)
  - Total: 54
- Time zone: UTC+3:30 (IRST)
  - Summer (DST): UTC+4:30 (IRDT)

Yahn (Persian: يهن, also Romanized as Yān) is a village in Alqurat Rural District, in the Central District of Birjand County, South Khorasan Province, Iran. At the 2006 census, its population was 54, in 24 families.
