= Yan =

Yan may refer to:

== Chinese states ==
- Yan (state) (11th century BC–222 BC), a major state in northern China during the Zhou dynasty
- Yan Kingdom (Han dynasty), first appearing in 206 BC
  - Prince of Yan title held in various dynasties of China
- Yan (Three Kingdoms), from 237 to 238
- Former Yan (337–370), a Xianbei state in present-day Hebei
- Western Yan (384–394), a Xianbei state in present-day Shanxi
- Later Yan (384–409), a Xianbei state during Sixteen Kingdoms Period
- Southern Yan (398–410), a Xianbei state in present-day Shandong
- Northern Yan (407–436), successor of Later Yan
- Yan (An–Shi) (756–763), a rebel state founded by the An Lushan rebellion
- Yan (Five Dynasties period) short-lived state in Hebei from 911 to 913

== Names ==
=== Surname ===
- Yan (surname), romanization for several Chinese surnames
- Yan, a Cantonese transcription of surname Zhen (甄)

=== Given name ===
==== Mononymous persons ====
- Yan Emperor, a legendary emperor of ancient China
- Yan, Marquis of Tian (died c. 370 BC), 4th-century BC ruler of the state of Qi
- Yan (musician) or Jan Scott Wilkinson, English singer-songwriter

==== First name ====
- Yan' Dargent (1824–1899), French painter
- Yan England, Canadian actor and television presenter
- Yan Gaylit (1894–1938), Soviet corps commander
- Yan Gomes (born 1987), Brazilian baseball player
- Yan Karlovich Berzin (1889–1938), Soviet military commander and politician
- Yan Klukowski (born 1987), English professional footballer
- Yan Pascal Tortelier (born 1947), French conductor and violinist
- Yan Rudzutak (1887–1938), Bolshevik revolutionary and a Soviet politician
- Yan Stastny (born 1982), Canadian-American ice hockey centre
- Yan Valery (born 1999), French-born football right-back
- Yan Zhu, software developer

==== Fictional characters ====
- Yan Bibiyan, children's book character by Bulgarian writer Elin Pelin

== Places ==
- Yan Mountains, a mountain range in north China
- Yan, Iran, a village in South Khorasan Province, Iran
- Yan, Kedah, a district in Malaysia

== Other uses ==
- Yeast assimilable nitrogen, the combination of free amino nitrogen, ammonia and ammonium for fermenting wine
- Youth Action Network, a former UK volunteering organisation
- Yan Lift, a defunct American Ski Lift company
