= John Hings =

English cricketer

Personal information
- Full name: John Preston Hings
- Born: 22 December 1910; Leicester, Leicestershire, England
- Died: September 1999 (aged 88–89); Loughborough, Leicestershire, England
- Batting: Right-handed
- Bowling: Unknown
- Relatives: John Hings, Sr. (father)

Domestic team information
- Years: Team
- 1934: Leicestershire

Career statistics
| Competition | First-class |
|---|---|
| Matches | 2 |
| Runs scored | 18 |
| Batting average | 4.50 |
| 100s/50s | –/– |
| Top score | 10 |
| Balls bowled | 6 |
| Wickets | – |
| Bowling average | – |
| 5 wickets in innings | – |
| 10 wickets in match | – |
| Best bowling | – |
| Catches/stumpings | 2/– |
- Source: Cricinfo, 3 March 2012

John Preston Hings (22 November 1910 – September 1999) was an English cricketer. Hings was a right-handed batsman whose bowling style is unknown. He was born at Leicester, Leicestershire.

Hings made two first-class appearances for Leicestershire in the 1934 County Championship against Nottinghamshire and Yorkshire. In his two first-class appearances, Hings scored a total of 18 runs at an average of 4.50, with a high score of ten.

He died at Loughborough, Leicestershire, sometime in September 1999. His father, John, Sr., played first-class cricket in South Africa.
