= Hinge =

Mechanical bearing connecting two objects

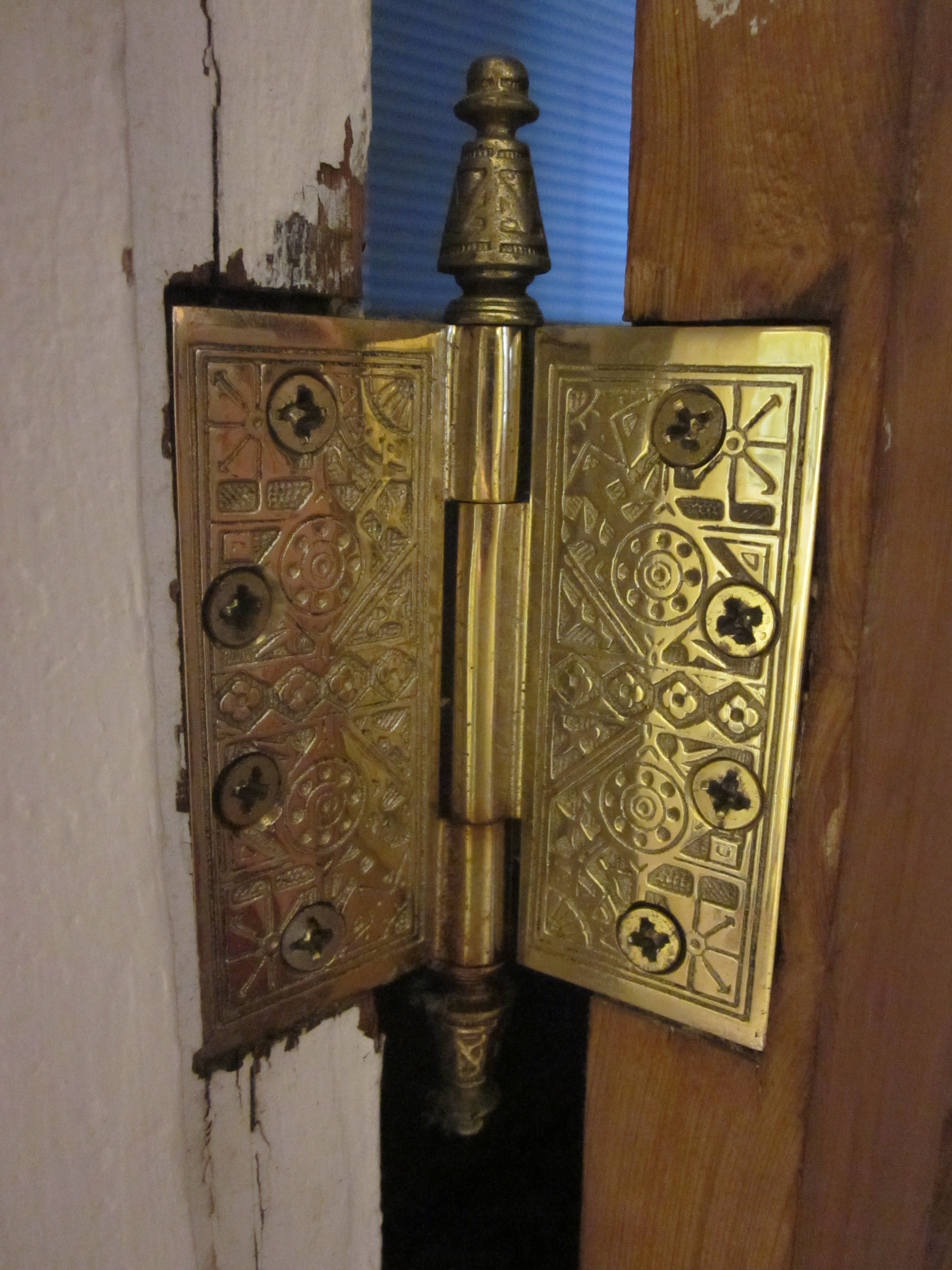
An ornate brass door hinge

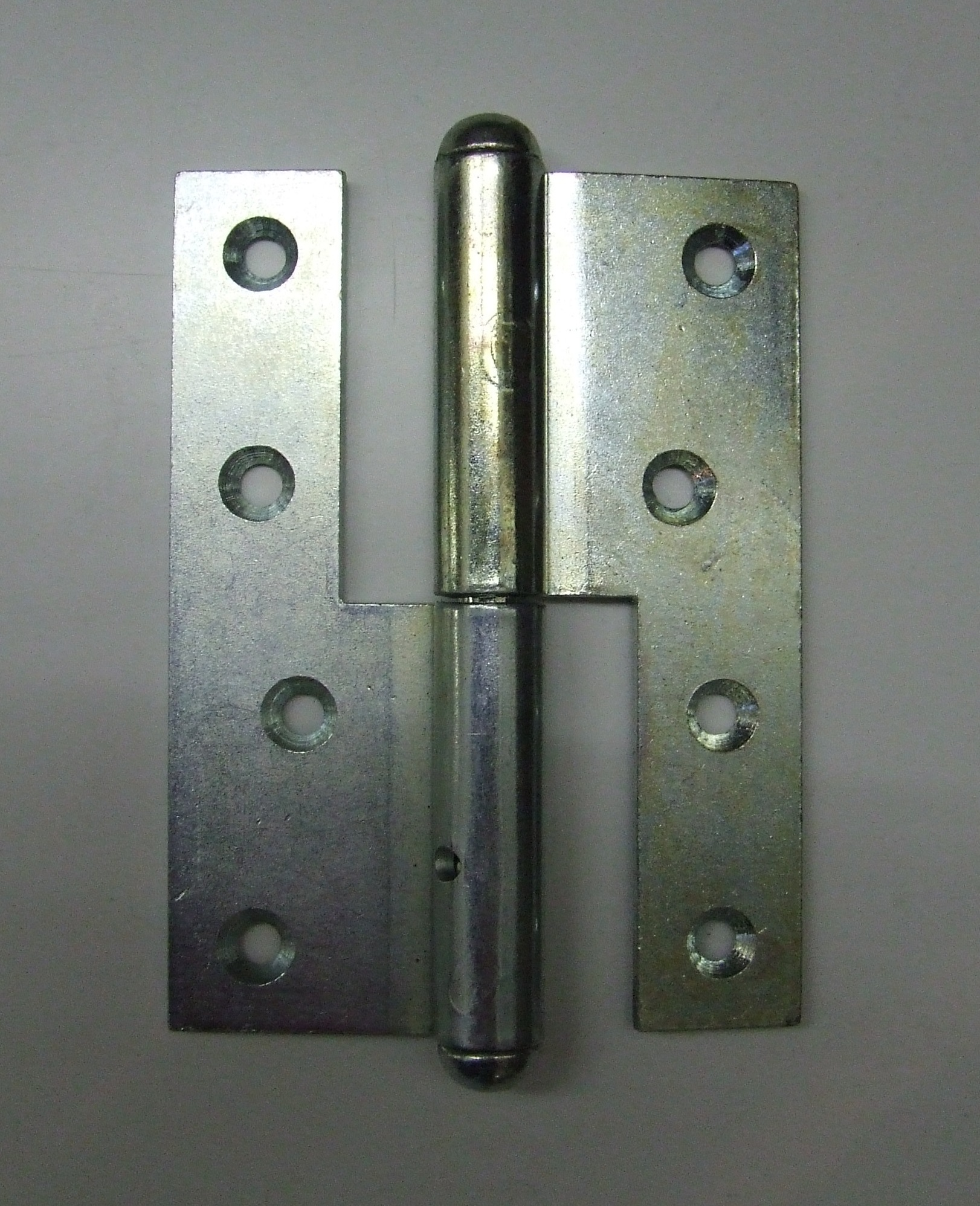
A barrel hinge

A hinge is a mechanical bearing that connects two solid objects, typically allowing only a limited angle of rotation between them. Two objects connected by an ideal hinge rotate relative to each other about a fixed axis of rotation, and all other translations or rotations are prevented; thus a hinge has one degree of freedom. Hinges may be made of flexible material or moving components. In biology, many joints function as hinges, such as the elbow joint.

Hinges are frequently used on pivoting doors, but also are seen on folding ladders and many other flexible mechanisms such as automobile hoods (bonnets), and even large bridges.

== History ==
Ancient remains of stone, marble, wood, and bronze hinges have been found. Some date back to at least Ancient Egypt, although it is nearly impossible to pinpoint exactly where and when the first hinges were used.

In Ancient Egypt, doors were constructed using a pivot hinge system, which consisted of pivots protruding from the edges of a door made either from dowels or carved as part of the door. These pivots were contained within a stone socket.

In Ancient Rome, hinges were called cardō, and gave name to the goddess Cardea and the main street Cardo. Cardō, in the sense of "the chief thing (on which something turns or depends)", is an element of modern words such as cardinal.

According to the Oxford English Dictionary, the English word hinge is related to hang.

== Building access ==
Since at least the medieval period, there have been hinges to draw bridges for defensive purposes for fortified buildings. Hinges are used in contemporary architecture where building settlement can be expected over the life of the building. For example, the Dakin Building in Brisbane, California, was designed with its entrance ramp on a large hinge to allow settlement of the building built on piles over bay mud. This device was effective until October 2006, when it was replaced due to damage and excessive ramp slope.

== Large structures ==
Hinges appear in large structures such as elevated freeway and railroad viaducts, to reduce or eliminate the transfer of bending stresses between structural components, typically in an effort to reduce sensitivity to earthquakes. The primary reason for using a hinge, rather than a simpler device such as a slide, is to prevent the separation of adjacent components. When no bending stresses are transmitted across the hinge, it is called a zero moment hinge.

== Spacecraft ==
A variety of self-actuating, self-locking hinges have been developed for spacecraft deployable structures such as solar array panels, synthetic aperture radar antennas, booms, radiators, etc.

== Terminology ==
Basic hinge

- Pin – The rod that holds the leaves together, inside the knuckle. Also known as a pintle.
- Knuckle – The hollow—typically circular—portion creating the joint of the hinge through which the pin is set. The knuckles of either leaf typically alternate and interlock with the pin passing through all of them.
- Leaf – The portions (typically two) that extend laterally from the knuckle and typically revolve around the pin.
- End play – Axial movement between the leaves along the axis of the pin. This motion allows the leaves to rotate without binding and is determined by the typical distance between knuckles (knuckle gap) when both edges of the leaves are aligned.
- Gauge – Thickness of the leaves.
- Hinge width – Length from the outer edge of one leaf to the outer edge of the other leaf, perpendicularly across the pin.
- Hinge length – The length of the leaves parallel to the pin.
- Knuckle length – The typical length of an individual knuckle parallel to the pin.
- Leaf width – Length from the center of the pin to the outer edge of the leaf.
- Pitch – Distance from the end of a knuckle to the same edge of its adjacent knuckle on the same leaf.
- Doorstop – A colloquialism referring to loose angular movement of the leaves relative to the pin.

== Types ==
=== Barrel hinge ===
A barrel hinge consists of a sectional barrel (the knuckle) secured by a pivot. A barrel is simply a hollow cylinder. The vast majority of hinges operate on the barrel principle.

=== Butt hinge / Mortise hinge ===
Any hinge designed to be set into a door or door frame is considered a butt hinge or mortise hinge. A hinge can also be made as a half-mortise, where only one half is mortised and the other is not. Most mortise hinges are also barrel hinges because of how they pivot (i.e., a pair of leaves secured to each other by knuckles through which runs a pin).

=== Butterfly / Parliament (UK) hinge ===
Butterfly or parliament hinges are hinges that hold surfaces flush when opened 180 degrees.

=== Case hinge ===
Case hinges are similar to butt hinges, but are usually more decorative; most commonly used in suitcases, briefcases, and the like.

=== Concealed hinge ===
Used for furniture doors (with or without a self-closing features and/or damping systems), concealed hinges consist of two parts: (1.) the cup and arm, and (2.) the mounting plate. They are also called "cup hinges", or "Euro hinges", as they were developed in Europe and use metric installation standards. Most concealed hinges offer the advantage of full in situ adjustability for standoff distance from the cabinet face, as well as pitch and roll by means of two screws on each hinge.

=== Continuous / Piano hinge ===
Continuous or piano hinges are a variety of barrel hinge that run the entire length of a door, panel, box, etc. They are manufactured with or without holes.

=== Flag hinge ===
Flag hinges are simple two-part hinges where a single leaf, attached to a pin, is inserted into a leaf with a hole. This allows the hinged objects to be easily removed (such as removable doors). They are made in right- and left-hand configurations.

=== H hinge ===
H hinges are capital H-shaped barrel hinges used on flush-mounted doors. Small H hinges (3–4 in or 76–102 mm) tend to be used for cabinets, while larger ones (6–7 in or 150–180 mm) are for passage doors and closet doors.

=== HL hinge ===
HL hinges were commonly used for passage doors, room doors, and closet doors in the 17th, 18th, and the 19th centuries. On taller doors, H hinges were occasionally used between them.

=== One-way hinge ===
A one-way hinge is a hinge which can only swing on one direction; it is the opposite of a two-way or double-action hinge.

=== Pivot hinge ===
A pivot hinge pivots in openings in the floor and the top of the door frame. Also referred to as double-acting floor hinges, they are found in ancient dry stone buildings and, rarely, in old wooden buildings. They are a low-cost alternative for use with lightweight doors. Doors with these hinges may be called haar-hung doors.

=== Self-closing hinge ===
Self-closing hinges are hinges that have an built-in mechanism to automatically close, often with a speed control function. The same as spring hinge, they usually use springs to provide force to close the door and have a mechanical or hydraulic damper to control door close speed. Self-closing hinges function as both hinges and door closers.

=== Spring hinge ===
Spring hinges are spring-loaded hinges that provide assistance in closing or opening the hinge leaves. An inner spring applies force to keep the hinge closed or opened.

=== Swing clear hinge ===
Also called offset door hinges, swing clear hinges allow doors to swing completely clear of their openings. They are often used to comply with Fair Housing Act (FHA) code by providing the minimum 32” clearance when using a 34” door slab.

=== Butler tray hinge ===
Butler tray hinges fold to 90 degrees and snap flat. They are for tables that have a tray top for serving.

=== Card table hinge ===
Card table hinges are mortised into the edges of antique or reproduction card tables and allow the top to fold onto itself.

=== Carpentier joint ===
Carpentier joints are hinges consisting of several thin metal strips of curved cross section.

=== Drop-leaf table hinge ===
Drop-leaf table hinges are mounted under the surface of a table with leaves that drop down. They are most commonly used with rule joints.

=== Hinged expansion joint ===
Hinged expansion joints are joints with hinges that allow the object or unit to bend in a single plane.

=== Living hinge ===
A hinge of flexible material (often plastic) that creates a join between two objects without any knuckles or pins is a living hinge. Molded as a single piece, these hinges have fewer moving parts and have several advantages over other designs, but are more susceptible to fatigue and breakage.

=== Other ===
Other types of hinges include:

- Coach
- Counter flap
- Cranked or storm-proof
- Double action non-spring
- Double action spring
- Flush
- Friction
- Lift-off
- Pinge (with a quick-release pin)
- Rising butt hinges or cam lift hinges have a spiral knuckle that lifts the door as it opens, allowing it to clear carpets or uneven floors, and closing it gravitationally
- Security
- Tee

== Gallery ==
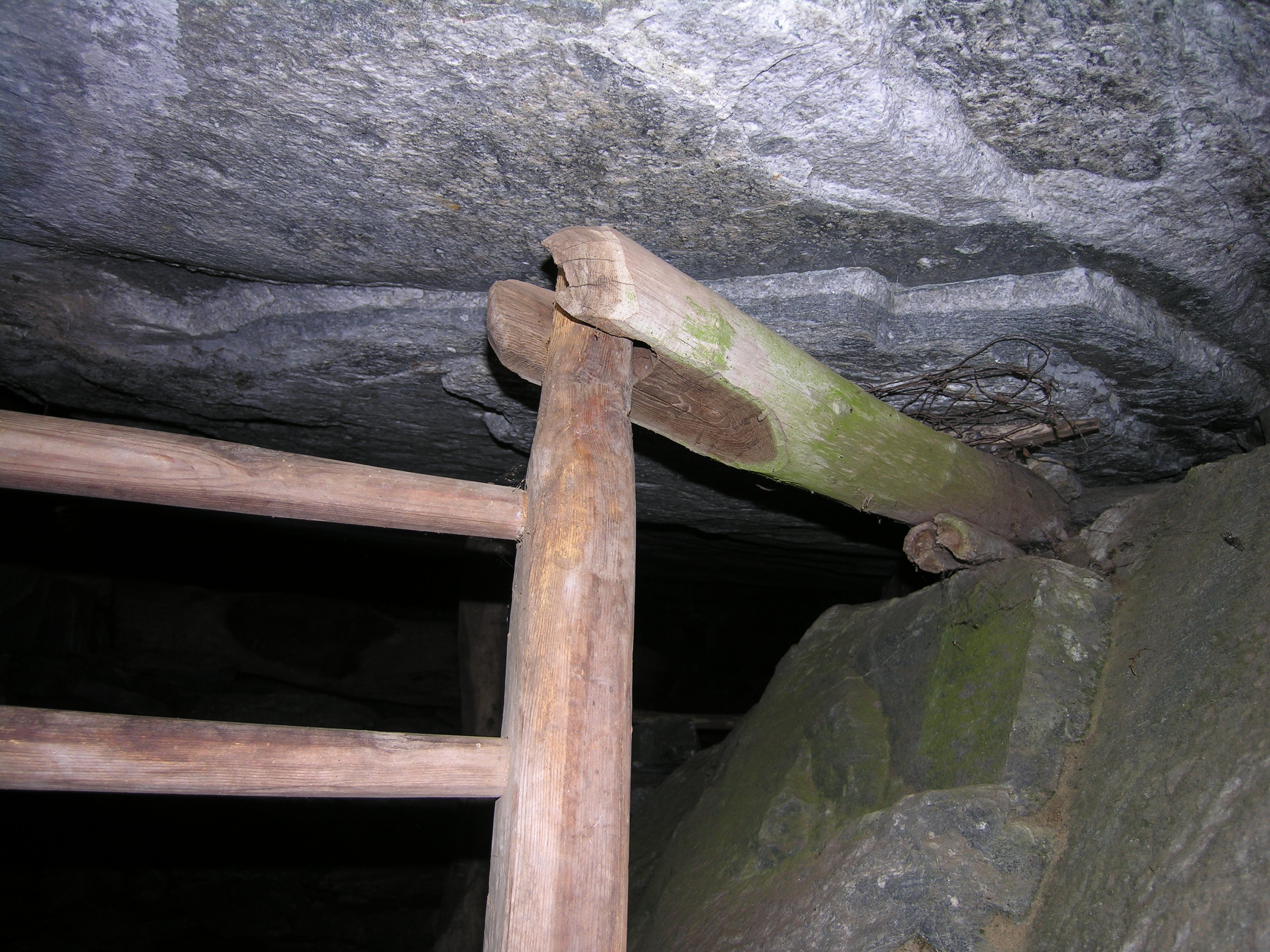
Old construction of hinges in the dry stone wall near Bignasco

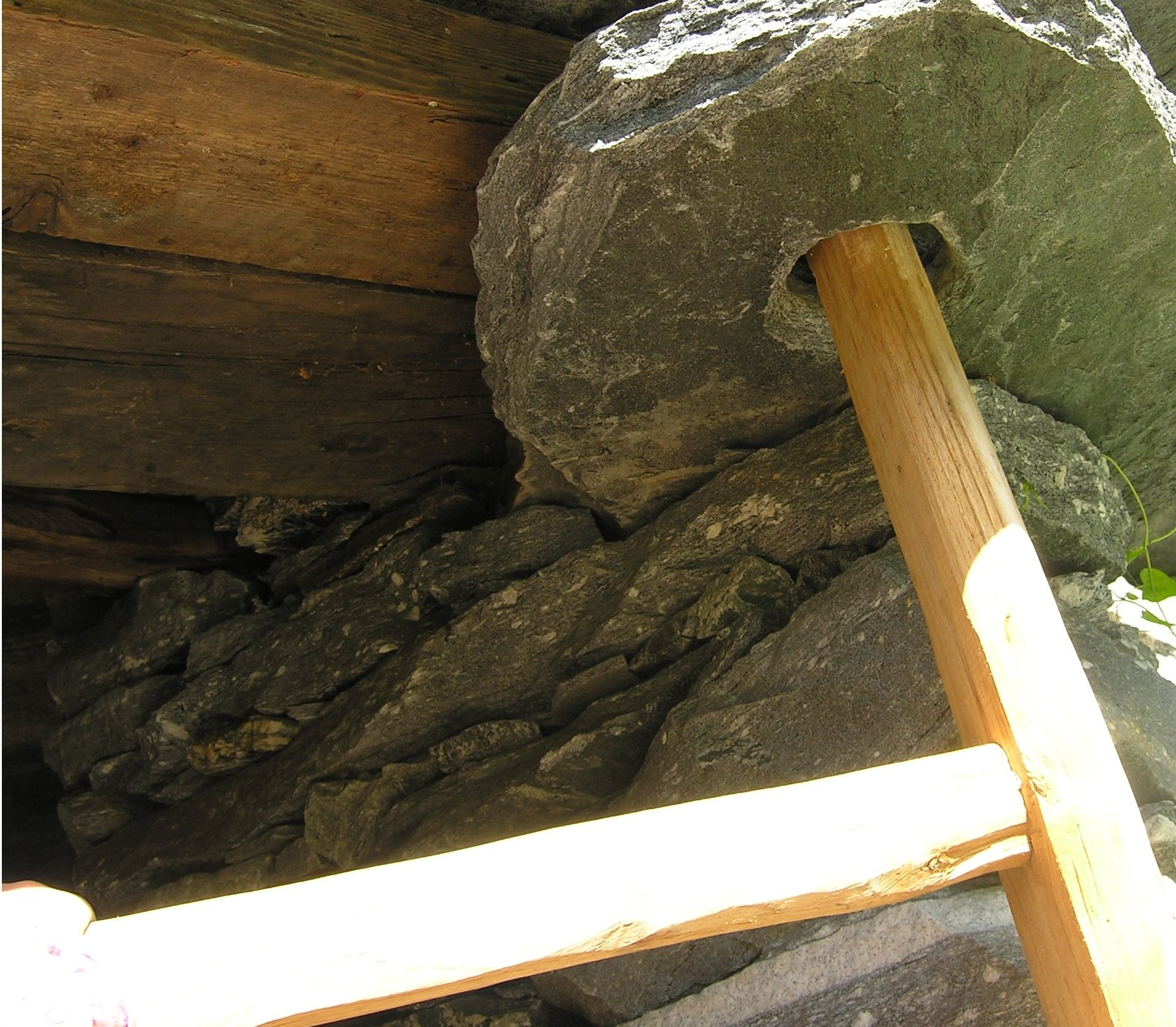
Ancient pivot hinges, found in the dry stone buildings

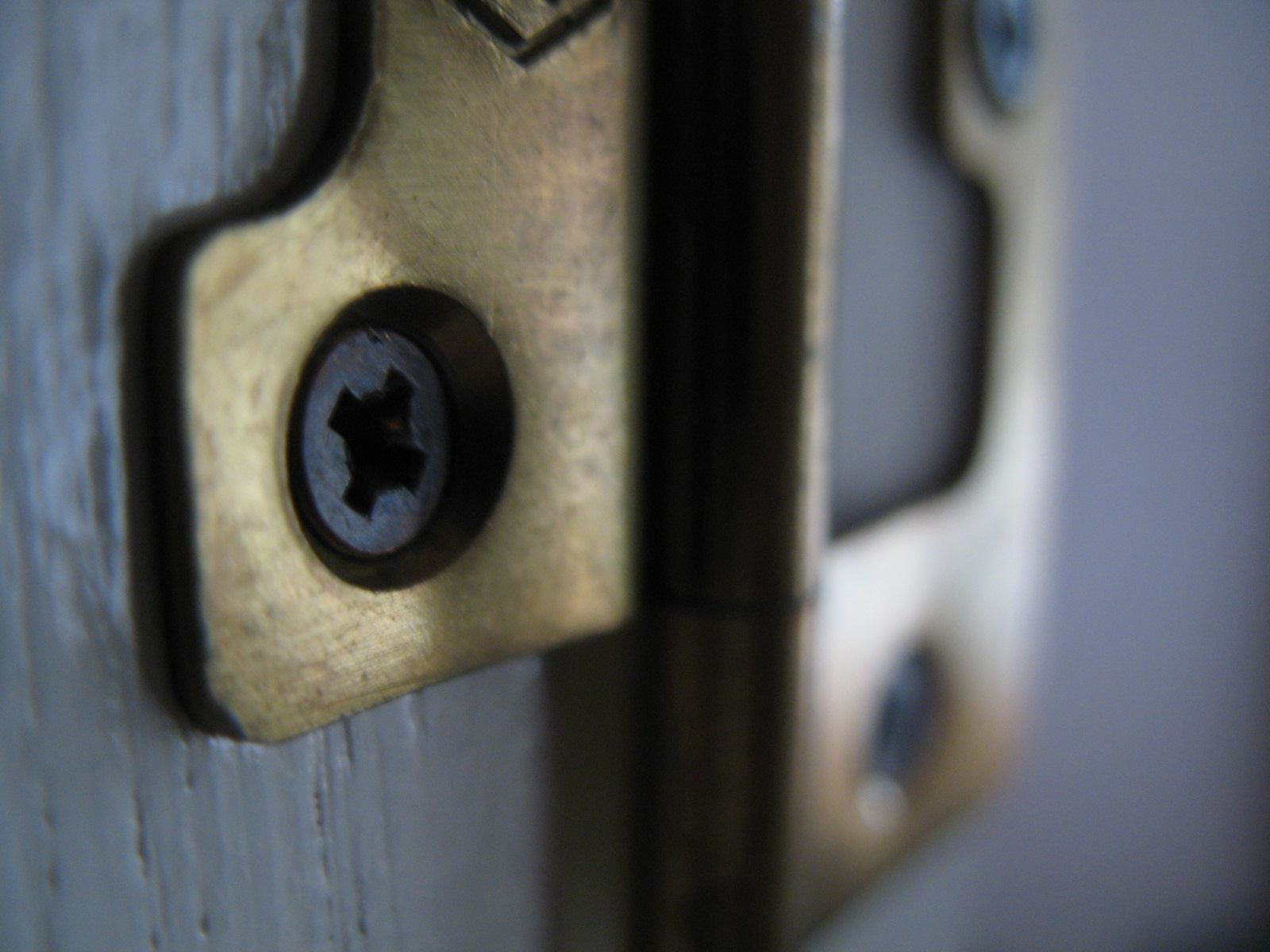
A flushed door hinge

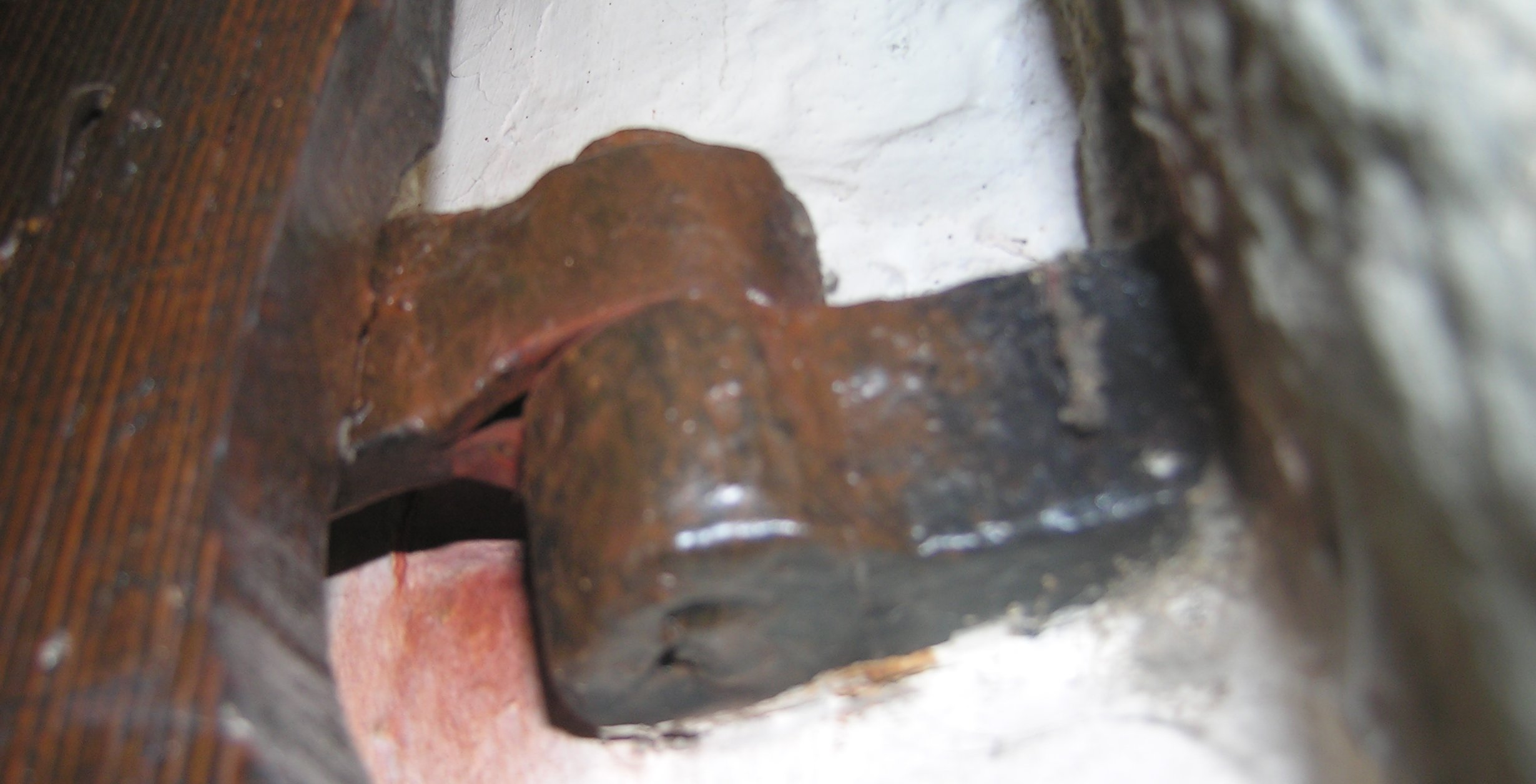
A barrel hinge made of wrought iron

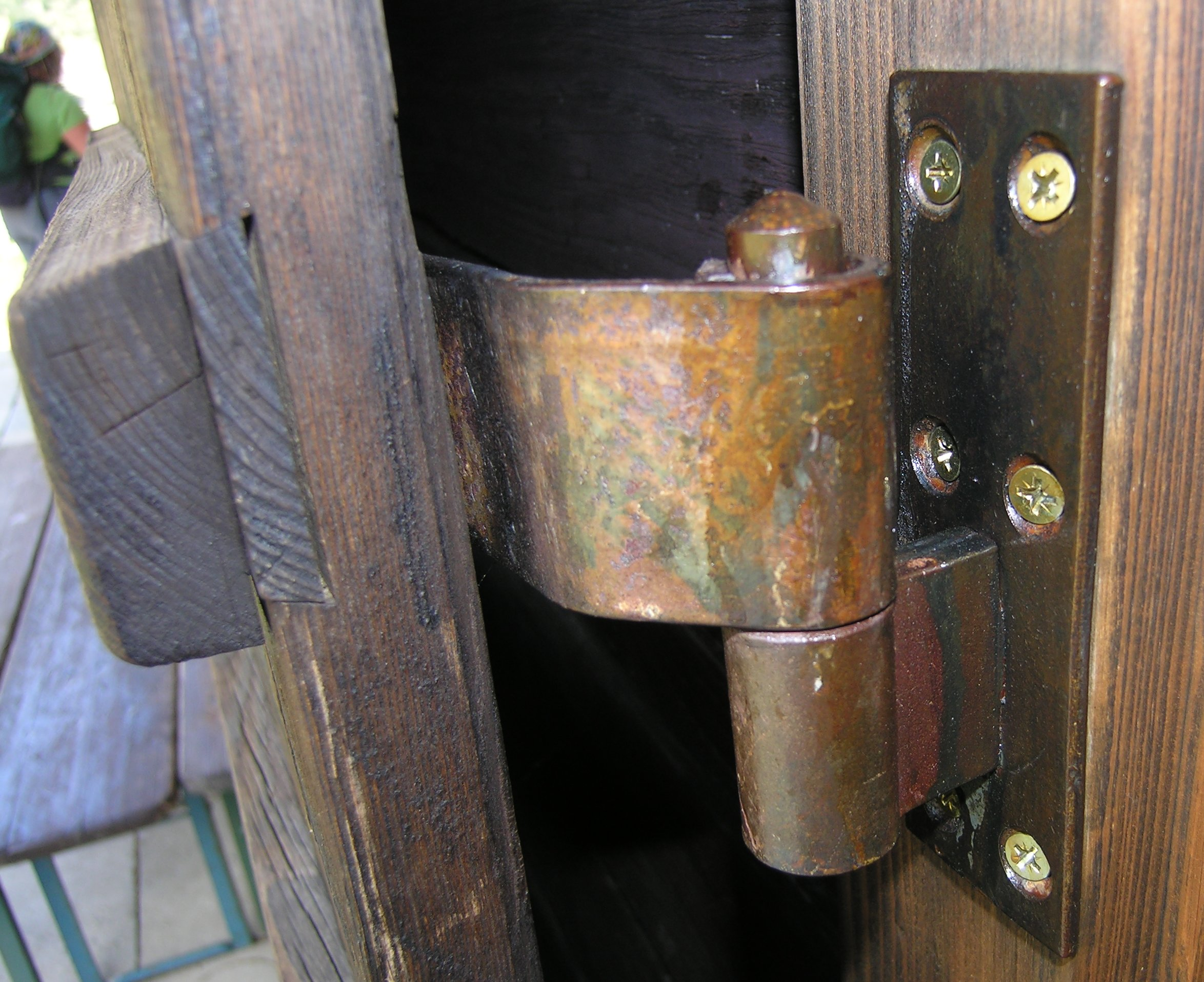
A barrel hinge made of bronze strap

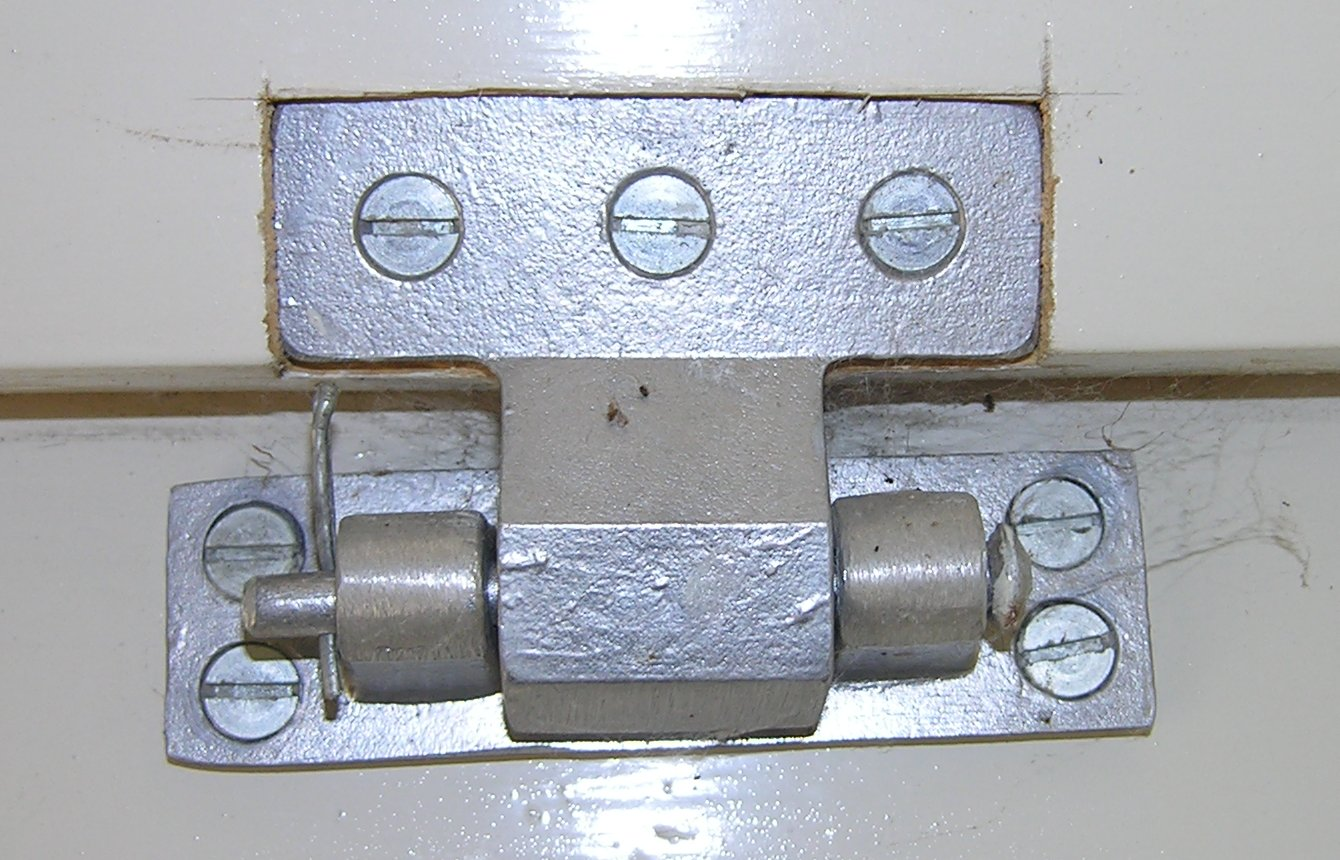
Increasing the number of loops to 3 allows the butt hinge axis to be fixed from both ends.

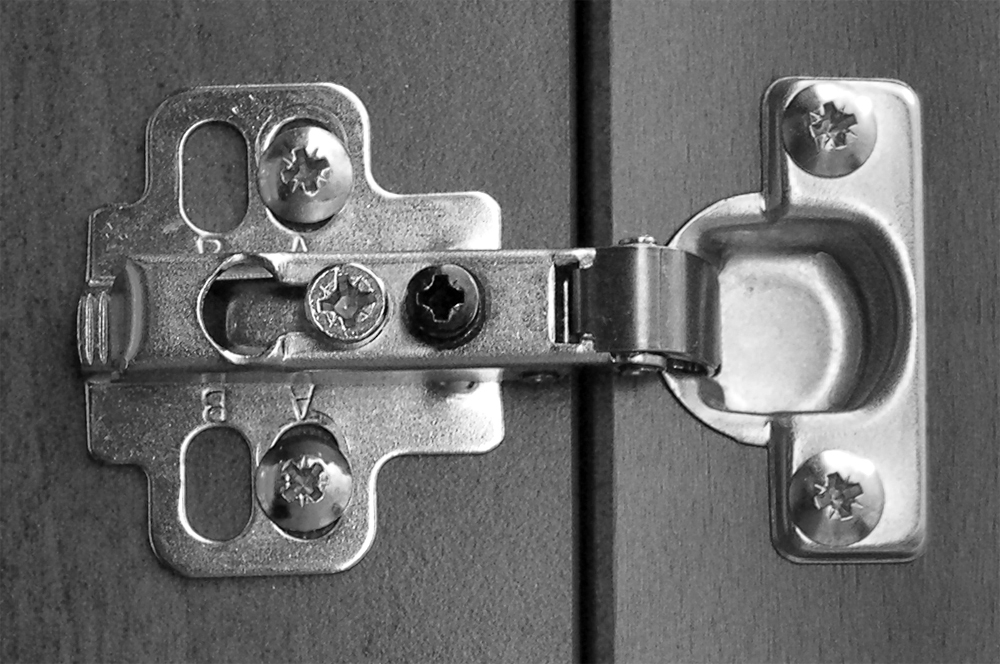
Door in furniture with spring to hold door either fully shut or fully open. It hides completely behind the door and has adjustment for fine alignment. Allows the door to open even when against a wall.

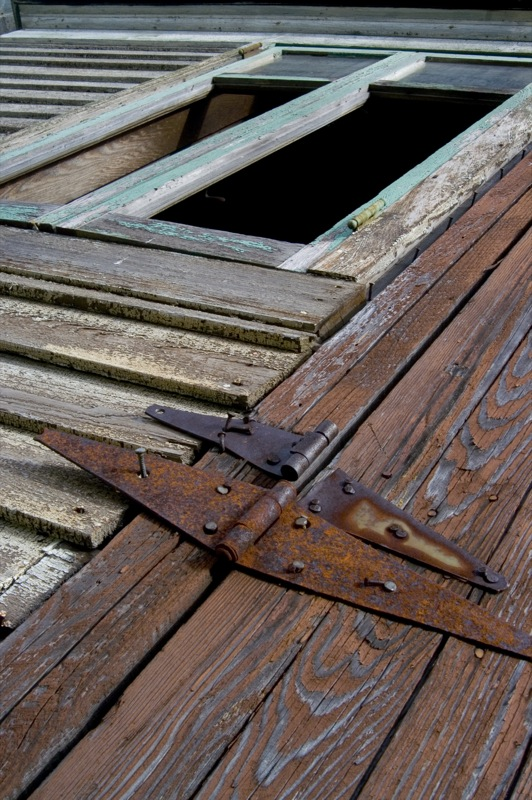
Rusty hinges on a building exterior

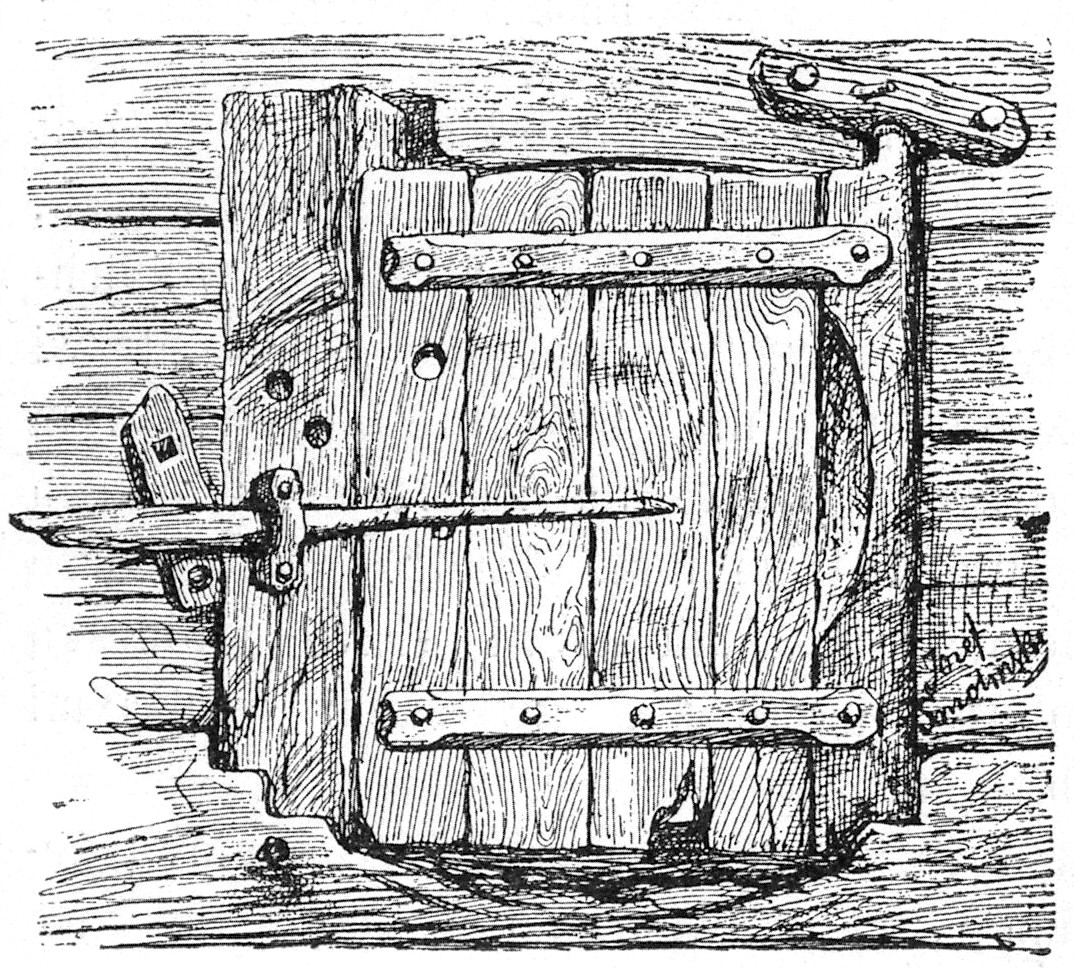
This door hinges on the stile and is called a haar-hung door.

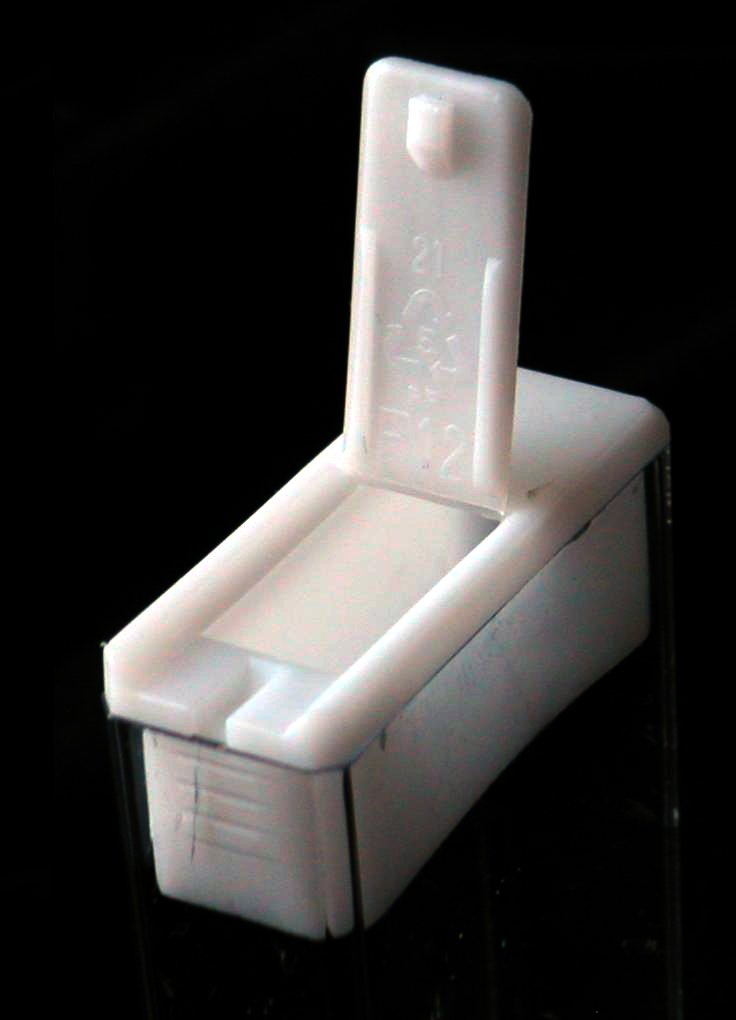
A living hinge on the lid of a Tic Tac box

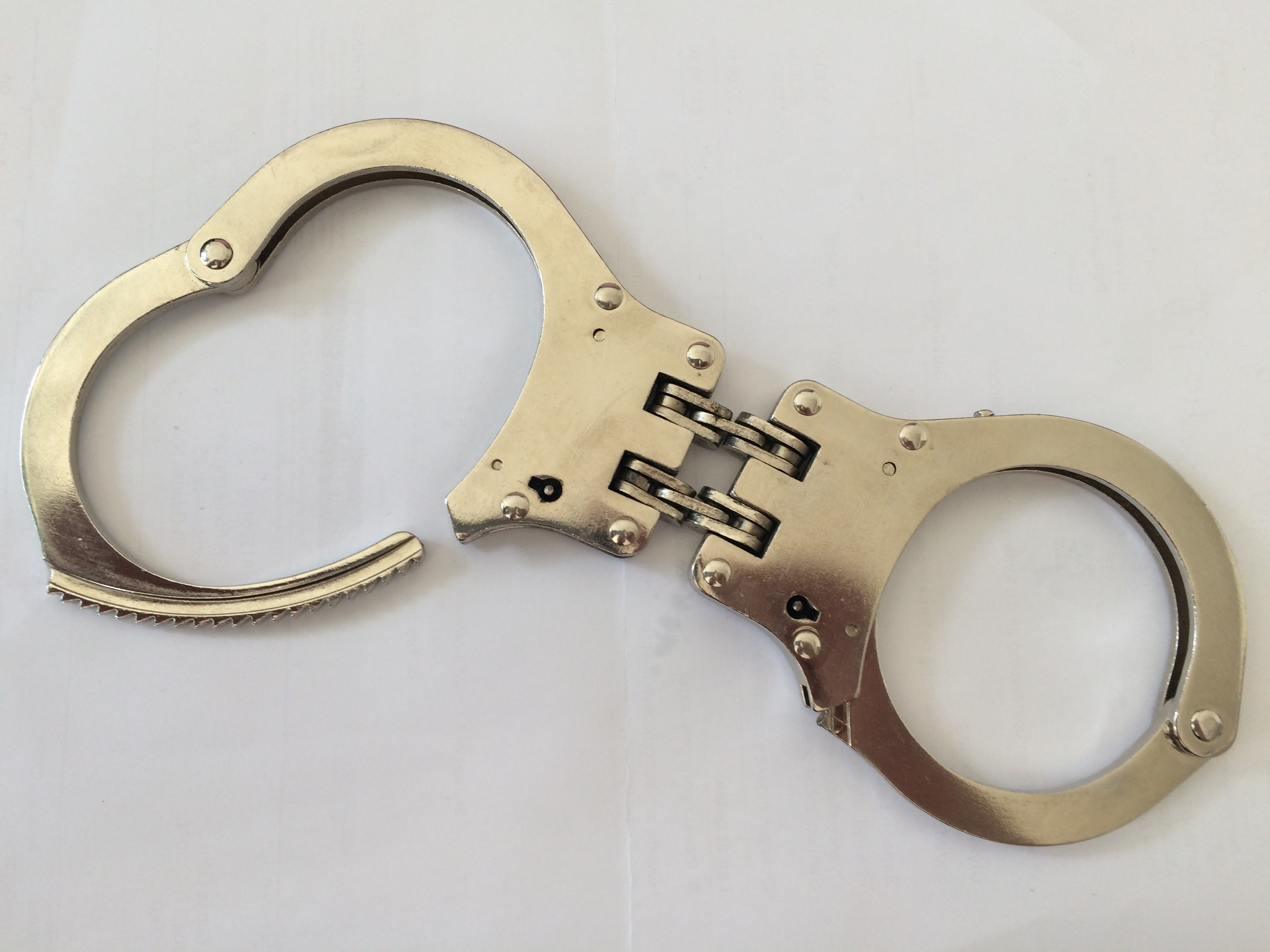
Hinged handcuffs

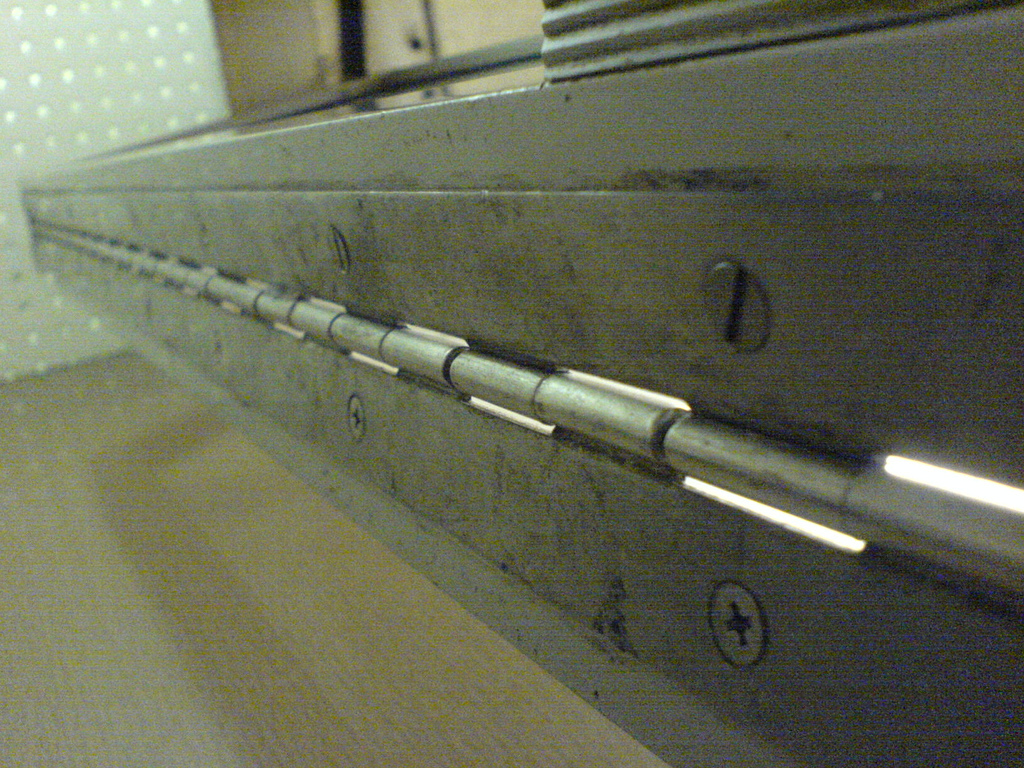
A piano hinge

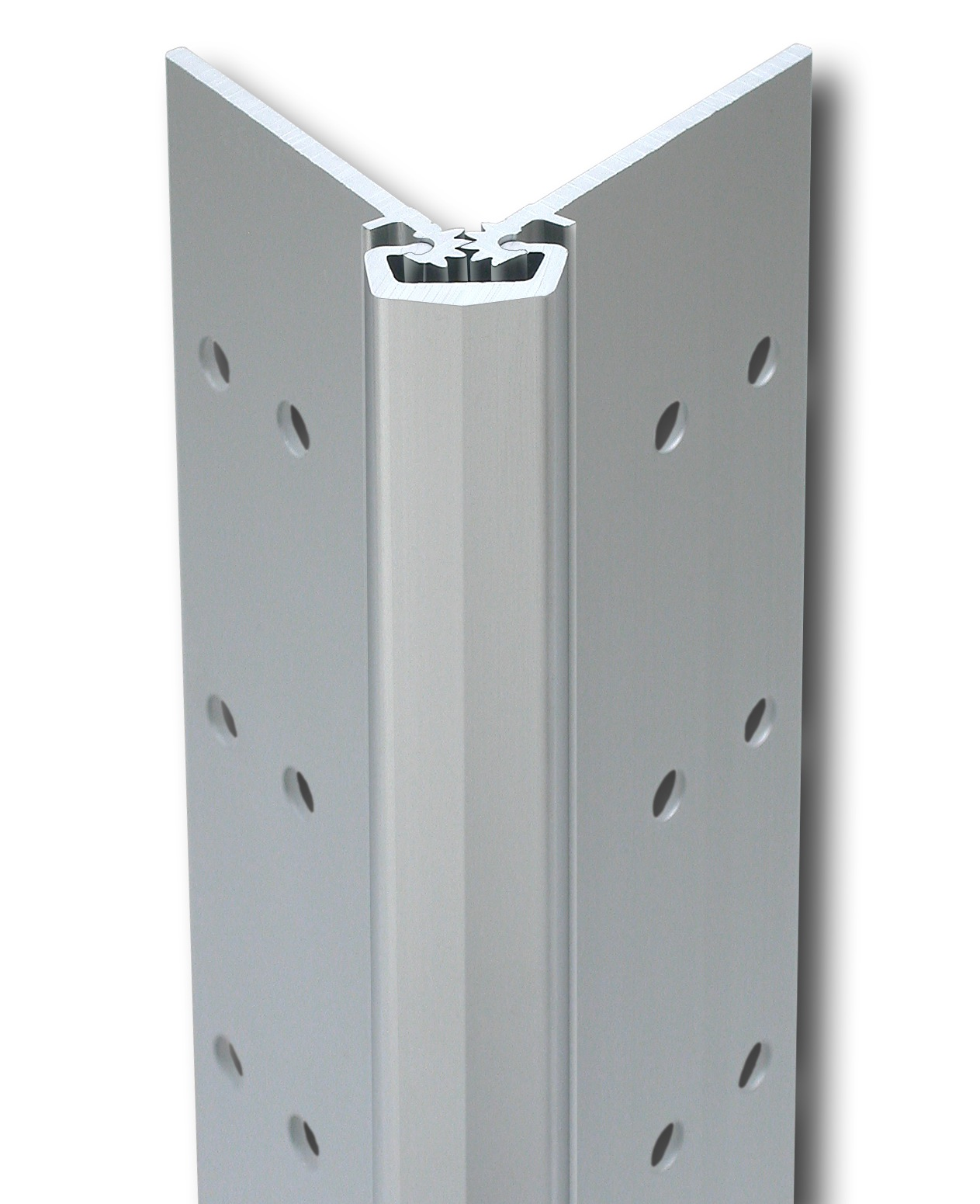
A continuous hinge

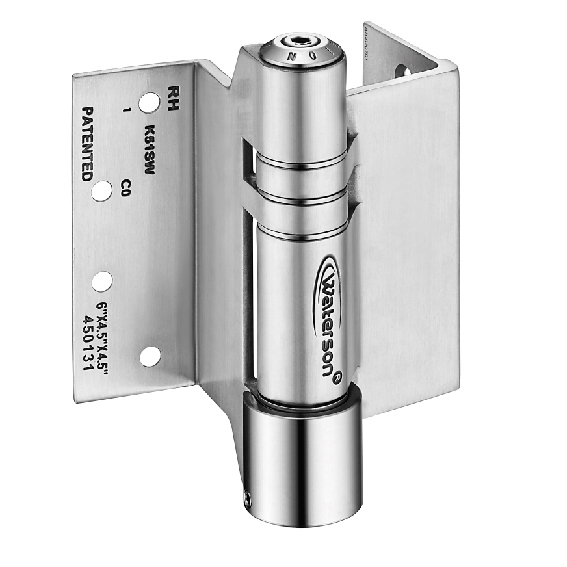
Swing clear hinge

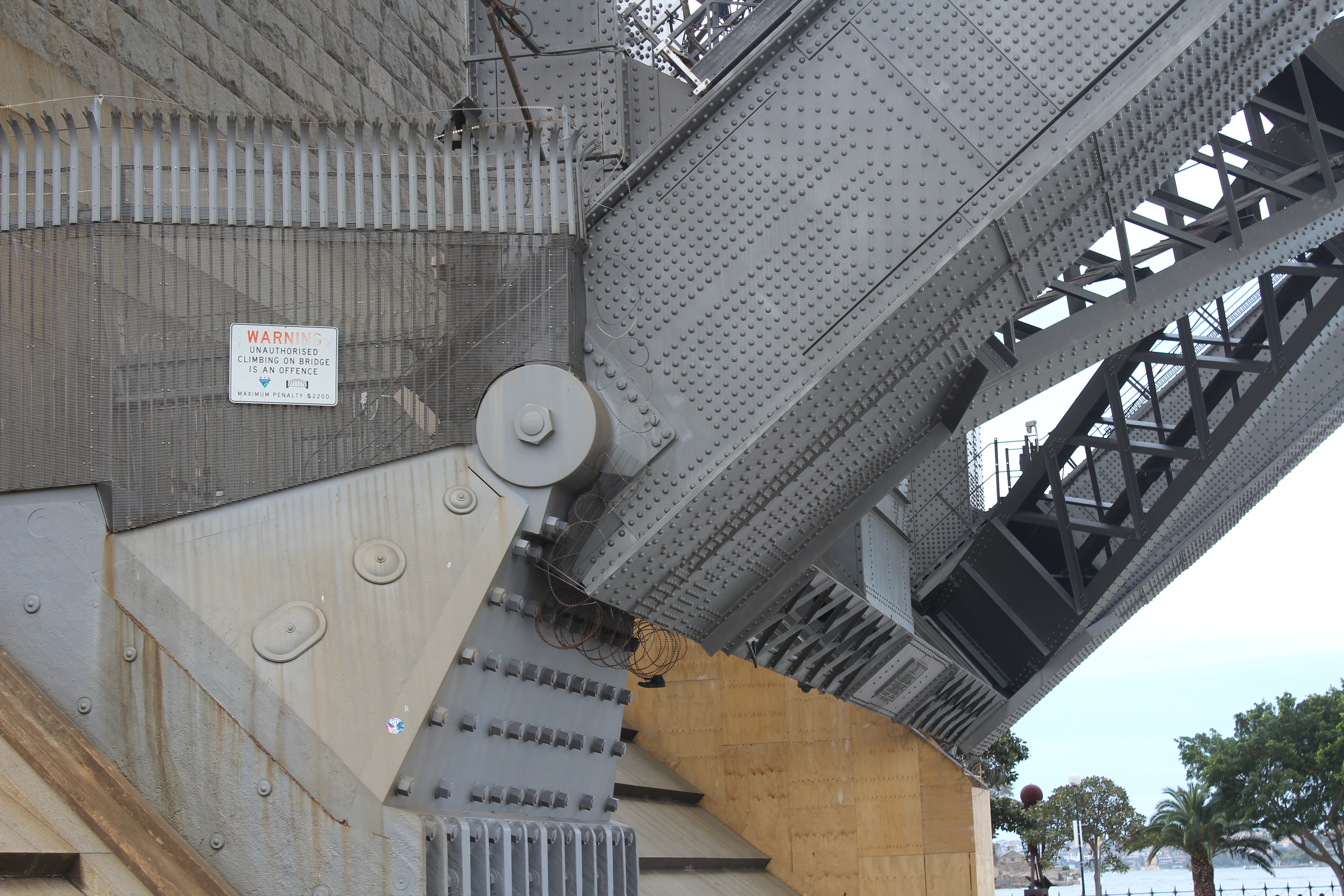
Hinge on the Sydney Harbour Bridge was used during construction of the bridge, and now accommodates thermal expansion and contraction of the bridge

== See also ==
- Concealed hinge jig – Support and locating tool for drilling recess holes to mount concealed hinges
- Floating hinge – Type of hinge that allows rotation and some linear movement
- Geared continuous hinge – Type of continuous hinge used mostly on doors in high-traffic entrances
- Hinge bender – Hand tool for adjusting hinges
- Hinge joint – Type of bone joint in human anatomy
- Plain bearing – Simplest type of bearing, with no rolling elements
