= Concealed hinge jig =

Support and locating tool for drilling recess holes to mount concealed hinges

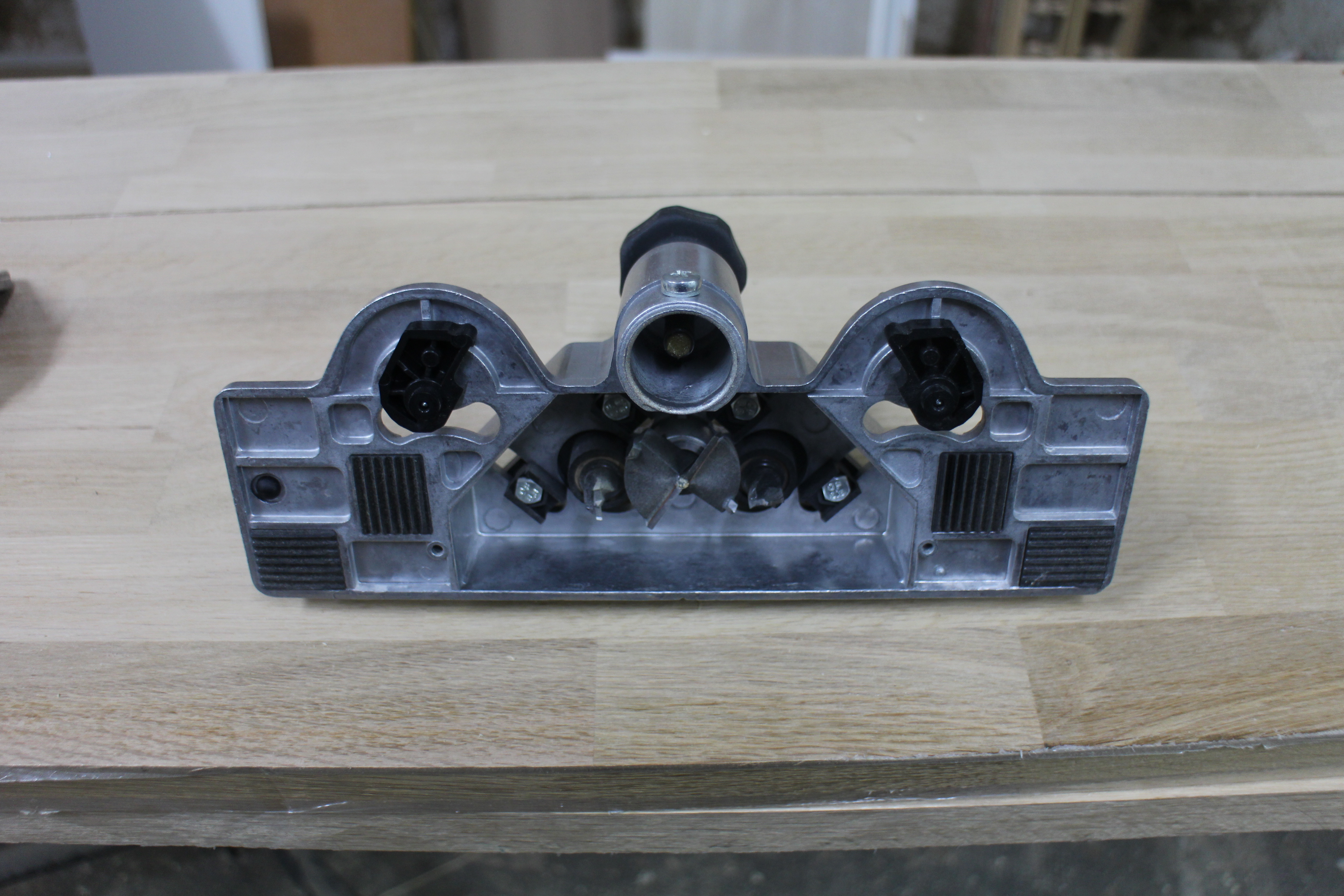
Concealed hinge drilling jig with embedded Forstner bit.

A concealed hinge drilling jig is a type of support jig, designed for drilling 3 cm holes to fit concealed hinges into modern wardrobe doors. As many of the complementary tools used in woodworking, it uses an electric hand-drill for its operation, making a Forstner bit to turn.

For most concealed hinges to work properly, a pit hole must be created on the door at the point where it faces the static part of the hinge which is screwed to the inside wall of the wardrobe. To create the pit hole, the jig must be fixed in place by means of the provided clamp, spin the Forstner bit by applying an electric hand-drill to its axle. The hole is drilled by pressing the hand-drill until a satisfactory pit hole is created.

The purpose of the drilling jig is to hold a Forstner bit in place, at a 90º angle while drilling 3 cm pit hole. The angle of the tool is critical for the performance of concealed hinges, the jig allows maintaining the 90º angle over a number of drilling sessions.

== Types of jigs ==
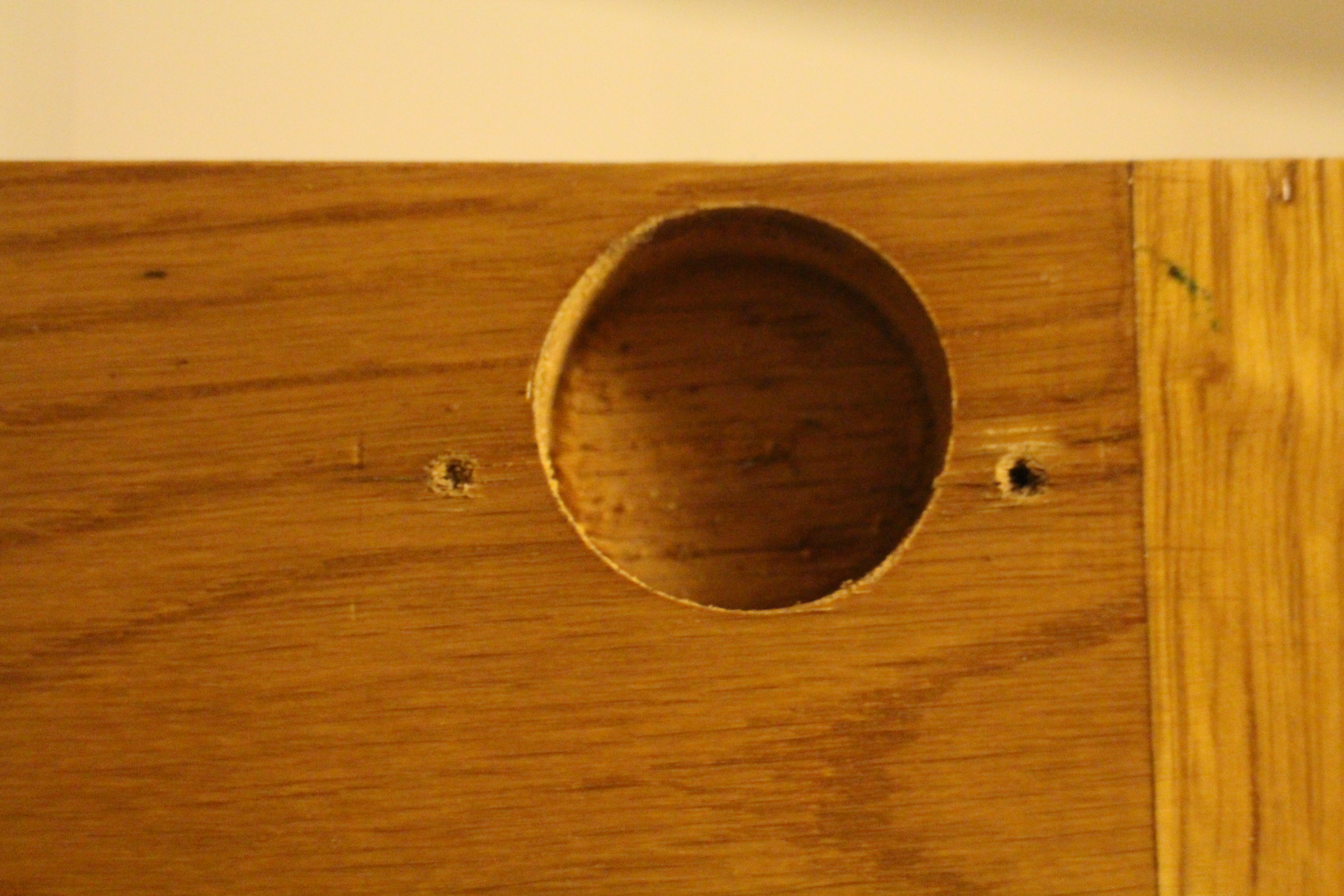
Drilled pit hole

In short, there are mainly two types of concealed hinge jigs, "push jigs" and "hole template jigs". Push jigs are used to hold the Forstner bit perpendicular to the door surface and a "hole template jig" it is simply used for marking the place of the pit hole, placing it parallel to the door edge.

There are many styles of jig available commercially. Fundamentally, all push jigs are similar in that they allow the user to clamp the jig tool in some way. The jig then has some means of placing the centre of the Forstner bit into the centre of the marked hole, in a way that a 90º angle is maintained respect to the door surface. A very common approach is to have a simple cardboard or aluminium template with marks for the distances to the door edges; these types of jigs are normally used with a hand drill fixed to a pedestal, for stability.

Many woodworkers prefer to drill pit holes by hand, but requires a bit of practice to achieve a perfectly drilled hole where the 90º angle is critical. The manual method does not require a jig but it's easier to drill the pit hole using one

== Concealed hinges ==
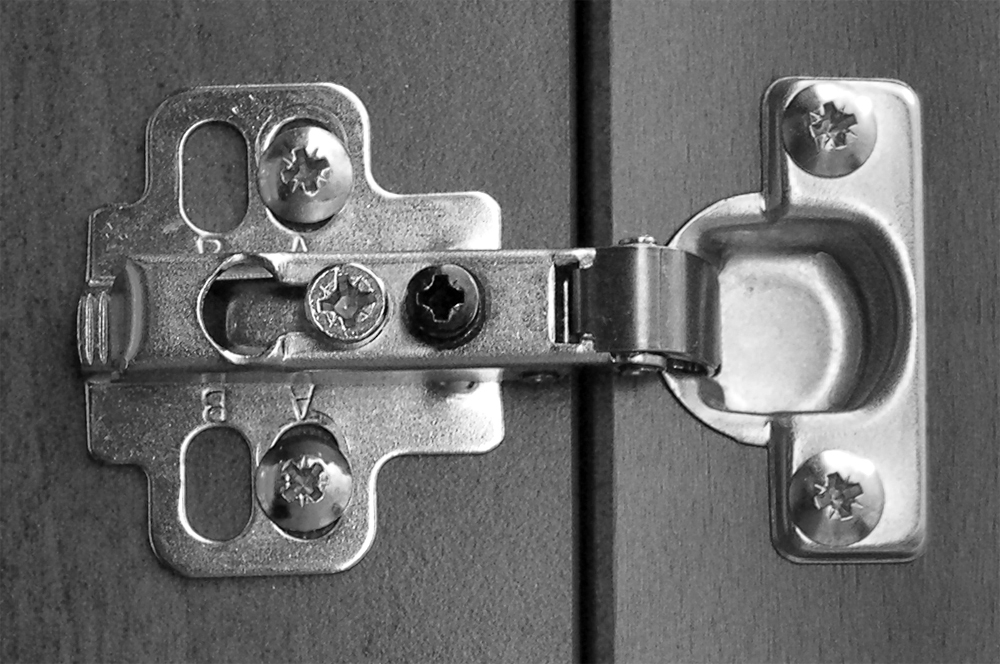
Concealed hinge shown in open position

Concealed hinges are set for furniture doors (with or without a self-closing feature, and with or without damping systems). They are made of two parts: one part is the hinge cup and the arm, the other part is the mounting plate. Also called "cup hinge", or "Euro hinge", as they were developed in Europe and use metric installation standards. Most such concealed hinges offer the advantage of full in situ adjustability for standoff distance from the cabinet face as well as pitch and roll by means of two screws on each hinge.

There are different types of concealed hinges depending on the format of the door where they are fitted:

- Straight;
- Bent;
- Super-bent;

There are as well varying degrees of openness: of 45°, 90° and 180° between the door blade and the wardrobe side, and of 165° (special adaptations for mounting in corners and chamfers).

== Forstner bits ==
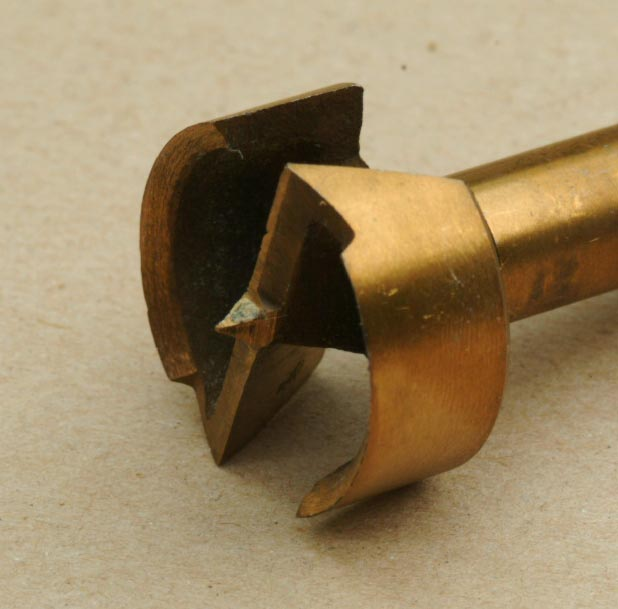
Forstner bit for jig

Forstner bits, named after their inventor, Benjamin Forstner, bore precise, flat-bottomed holes in wood, in any orientation with respect to the wood grain. They can cut on the edge of a block of wood, and can cut overlapping holes. Because of the flat bottom to the hole, they are useful for drilling through veneer already glued to add an inlay. They require great force to push them into the material, so are normally used in drill presses or lathes rather than in portable drills. Unlike most other types of drill bits, they are not practical to use as hand tools.

The bit includes a center point which guides it throughout the cut (and incidentally spoils the otherwise flat bottom of the hole). The cylindrical cutter around the perimeter shears the wood fibers at the edge of the bore, and also helps guide the bit into the material more precisely. The tool in the image has a total of two cutting edges in this cylinder. Forstner bits have radial cutting edges to plane off the material at the bottom of the hole. The bit in the image has two radial edges. Other designs may have more. Forstner bits have no mechanism to clear chips from the hole, and therefore must be pulled out periodically.

== See also ==
- Floating hinge – Type of hinge that allows rotation and some linear movement
- Plain bearing – Simplest type of bearing, with no rolling elements
- IKEA – Multinational furniture company founded in Sweden
