= Qing (disambiguation) =

The Qing dynasty (清朝) was a dynasty of China that lasted from 1644 to 1912.

Qing may also refer to:

- Qing (concept) (情, "feelings"), a concept in Chinese philosophy
- Qing (color) (青), a Chinese color term, inclusive of shades of green, blue, and black
- Qing (青), a Chinese abbreviation for Qinghai Province, China
- Qing (青), a Chinese abbreviation for Qingdao in Shandong Province, China
- Qing County (青县), in Hebei, China
- Qing (顷), an old Chinese unit of area equal to 100 mu, whose value has varied over time and place
- Qing (磬), the Chinese name for a sounding stone, a musical instrument
- Jing Qing (景清; died 1402), Chinese councilor
- Wu Qing (吴清; born 1965), Chinese politician

== See also ==
- Ching (surname)
- Hing (surname)
- 清 (disambiguation)
