= Kitchen cabinet =

Kitchen furniture

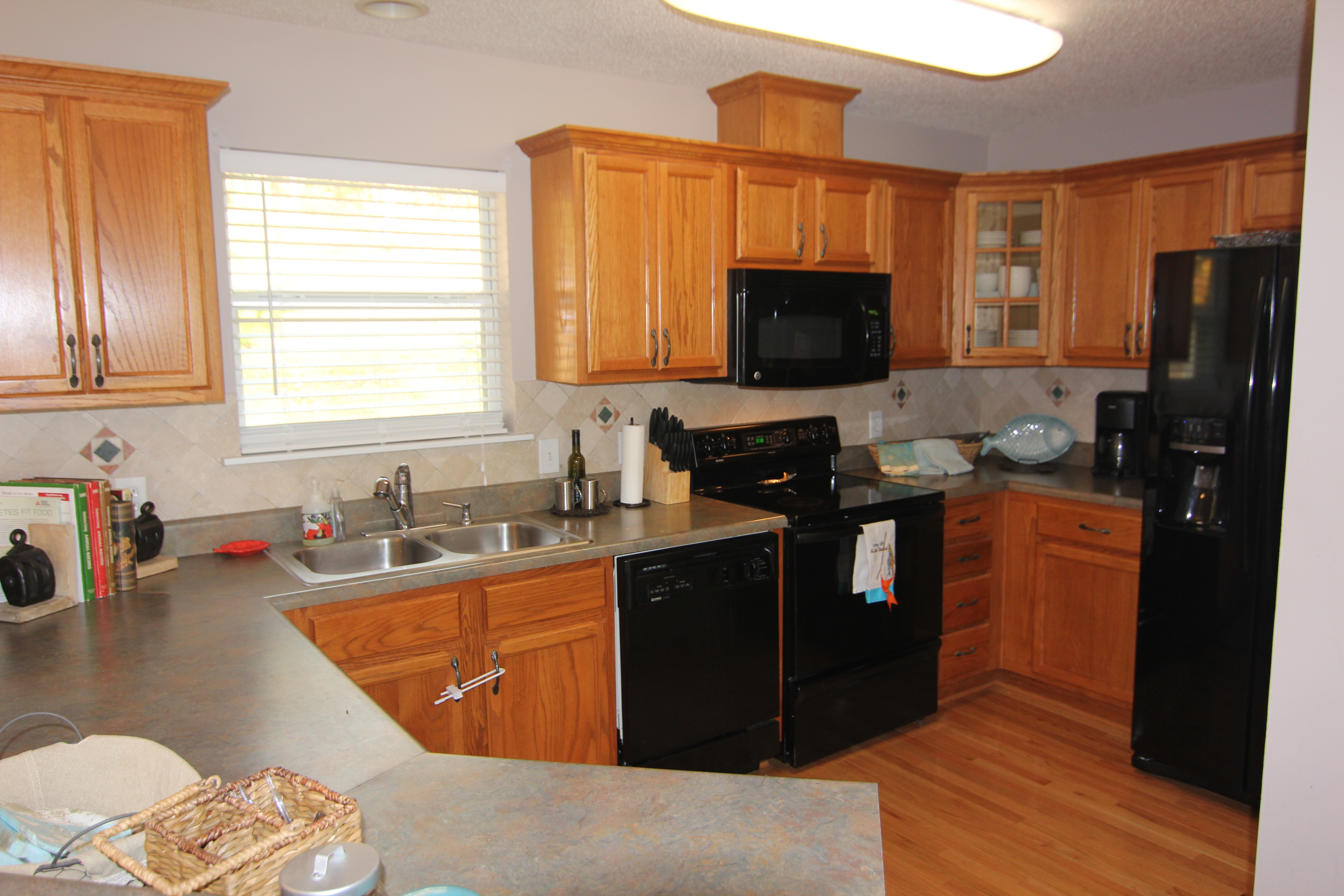
Residential kitchen with wood cabinets

Kitchen cabinets are the built-in furniture installed in many kitchens for storage of food, cooking equipment, and often silverware and dishes for table service. Appliances such as refrigerators, dishwashers, and ovens are often integrated into kitchen cabinetry. There are many options for cabinets available at present.

== History ==
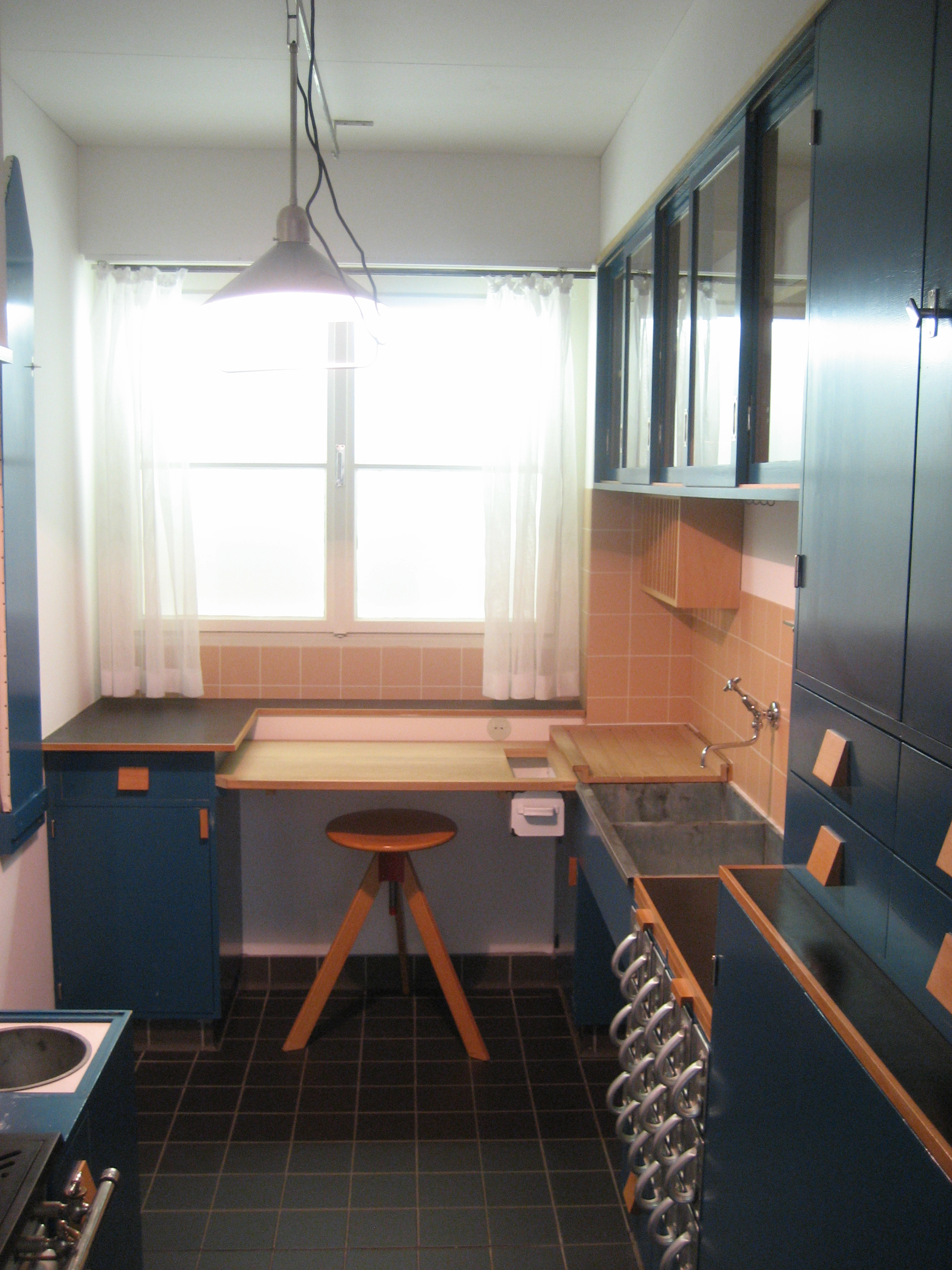
The Frankfurt kitchen of 1926

As commonly used today, the term kitchen cabinet denotes a built-in kitchen installation of either a floor or a wall cabinet. Typically, multiple floor cabinets are covered by a single counter, and floors and walls are not accessible behind and under the cabinets. Kitchen cabinets per se were invented in the 20th century. A precursor, not built-in, was the Hoosier cabinet of the 1910s, a single piece of furniture incorporating storage and work surfaces, of which over 2 million were sold by 1920.

- Pre-WW-I cabinet design. Typical kitchens before World War I used freestanding work tables and a pantry for dry storage. Cupboards were sometimes used in kitchens, though in larger houses dishes were more typically stored in the dining room or butler's pantry. Perishable foods such as milk, meat, and vegetables were purchased daily.
- Post-WW-I industrial era. Increasing interest in household efficiency led to pioneering motion studies of housework in the 1920s by industrial psychologist Lillian Moller Gilbreth. Subsequent improvements in kitchen design set the stage for the familiar built-in cabinetry of the present day. At the time, work surfaces were typically made of linoleum or stainless steel. Improvements in technology eventually made industrial-scale cabinet production possible.
- Post-WW-II cabinet design. In the U.S., countertops of high-pressure laminates such as Formica became popular. Laminates led to the adoption of the seamless flush-surface kitchen design that is common today, though laminates themselves began to be supplanted by solid surface materials, such as stone and quartz. In Europe, built-in cabinets had also been pioneered in the 1920s. With improved materials, the frameless cabinet style, notable for its architectural minimalism reminiscent of Bauhaus design, emerged in European kitchen design and was soon adopted worldwide.
- Post-modern cabinet design trends. Other elements of kitchen design affect the choice of cabinetry. For example, post-modern kitchens tend to be characterized by hardwood floors, earth tones, and bare walls in place of wallpaper which, in turn, affect cabinetry choices. Various trends include the introduction of more expensive options, space-saving measures, a larger number of ovens, thicker countertops [2–3 inches (51–76 mm)], taller base cabinets, honed finishes, taller countertop appliances, undercounter and task lighting, and higher [e.g., 9-foot (2.7 m)] ceilings. While these are general kitchen design trends, they have also influenced cabinetry.
- Kitchens today. Modern kitchen design has improved partly as a result of ergonomic research. Functionality is important; one research study had "anthropological scientists" observing homeowners "interact" with their kitchen cabinets. Kitchens are larger and have more cabinets; some kitchens may have as many as fifty drawers and cabinet doors. New features today include deep drawers for cookware, pull-out shelves to avoid excess bending, sponge trays on the front of sink cabinets, pullout hideaway garbage/recycling containers, pull-out spice cabinets, lazy susans in corner cabinets, vertical storage for cookie sheets, full-extension drawer slides, and drawers and doors with so-called soft-close/positive-close mechanisms enabling drawers to shut quietly, or which shut fully after being pushed only partially. As housing stocks get older, many homeowners face problems with visually unappealing older kitchen cabinets; in such situations, there is a choice to buy new (most expensive), reface existing (less expensive), or to strip and refinish existing (least expensive if done by the homeowner) cabinets. By 2009, there was more emphasis on cabinets designed with environmental factors in mind. So-called "green cabinets" were becoming more popular. As homes in Western countries became more airtight to save on heating and cooling costs, air quality has sometimes suffered as gases which are released from resins as they cure. Resins, organic materials which convert from liquid to solid form, are used to manufacture engineered wood (e.g., particleboard) frequently used to build kitchen cabinet carcases can be a factor. According to a recent report:

Considering that North Americans spend a large proportion of their lives indoors, it’s clear why this is a key issue in designing healthy spaces. Additionally, air quality is not a stand-alone problem; rather, every other component of the home can affect air quality. Air quality can be compromised by off-gassing from cabinetry, countertops, flooring, wall coverings or fabrics; by cooking by-products released into the air, and by mold caused by excess moisture or poor ventilation.

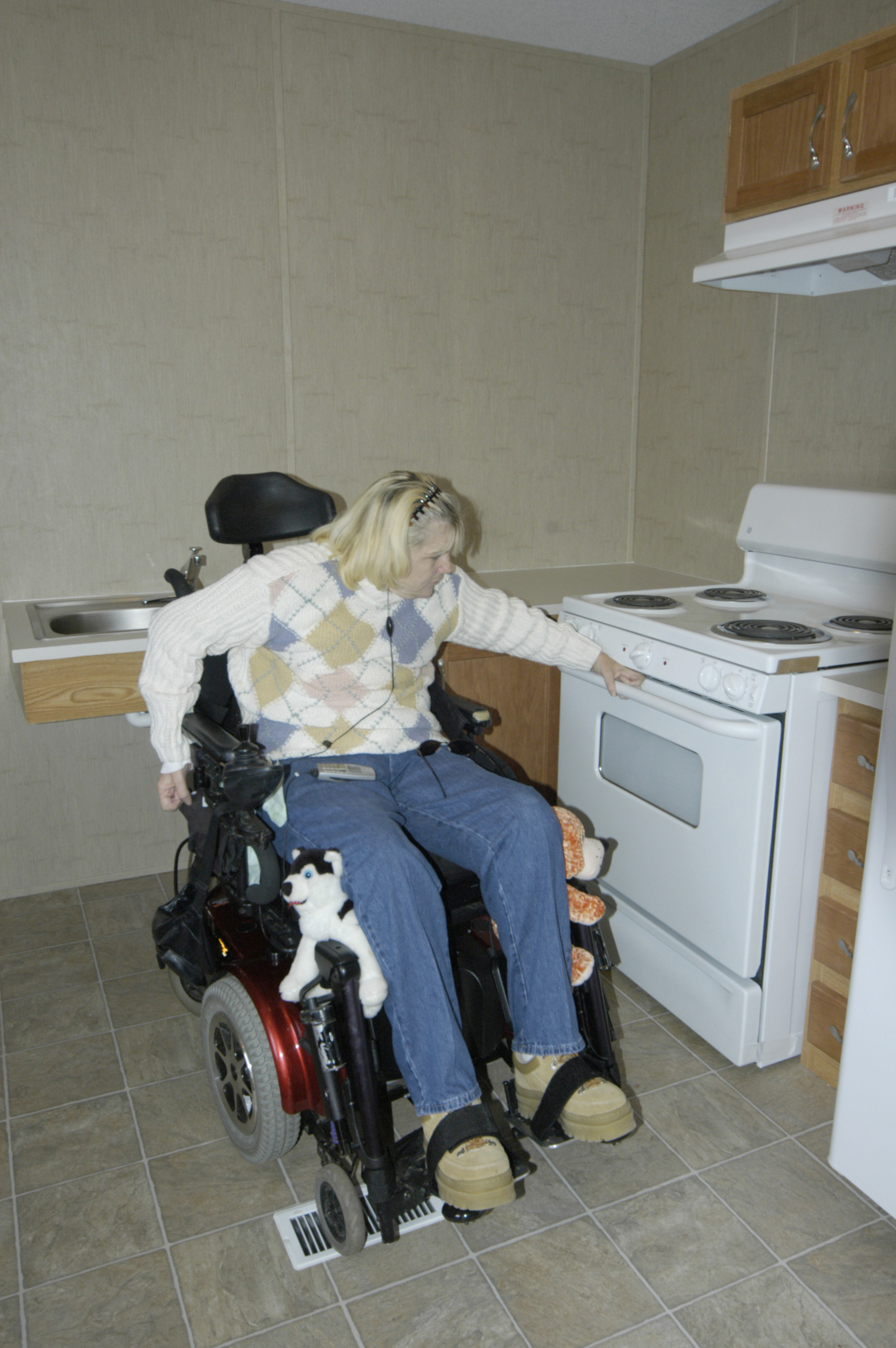
A wheelchair user inspects the functionality of a universal design kitchen

- Universal design Some designers have begun to build houses and cabinetry to address the needs of users throughout the human life cycle and among all user capabilities, under a concept called universal design. The United States requires universal design for federally-funded housing, under the Americans with Disabilities Act of 1990. Universal design features include easily manipulated handles, low switches, and numerous other innovations.

== Cabinet wood choices ==
Cabinets consist of six-sided wooden boxes or "carcass" closed on five sides with a door or drawers on the sixth.

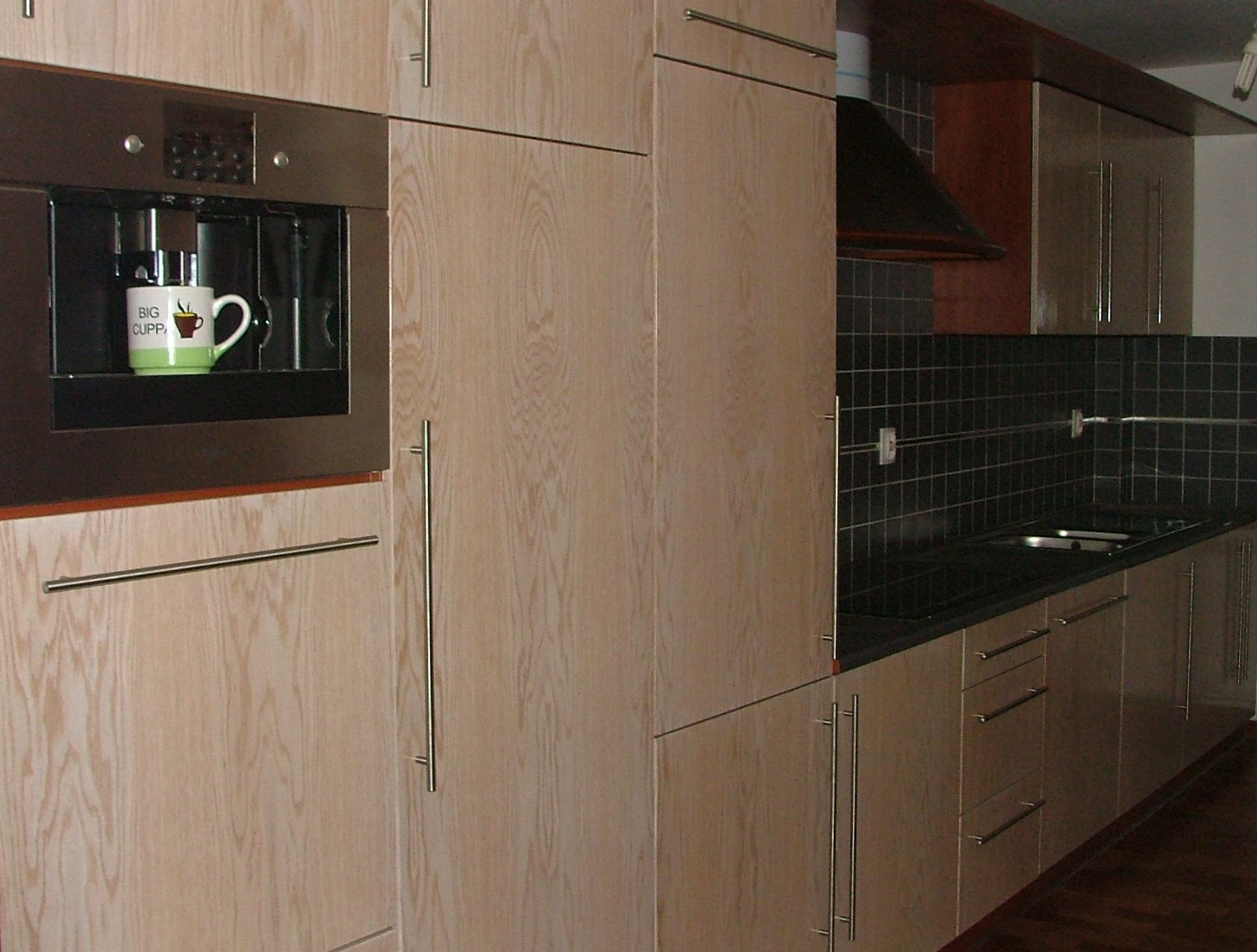
A cabinet wall, and a counter with sink and backsplash.

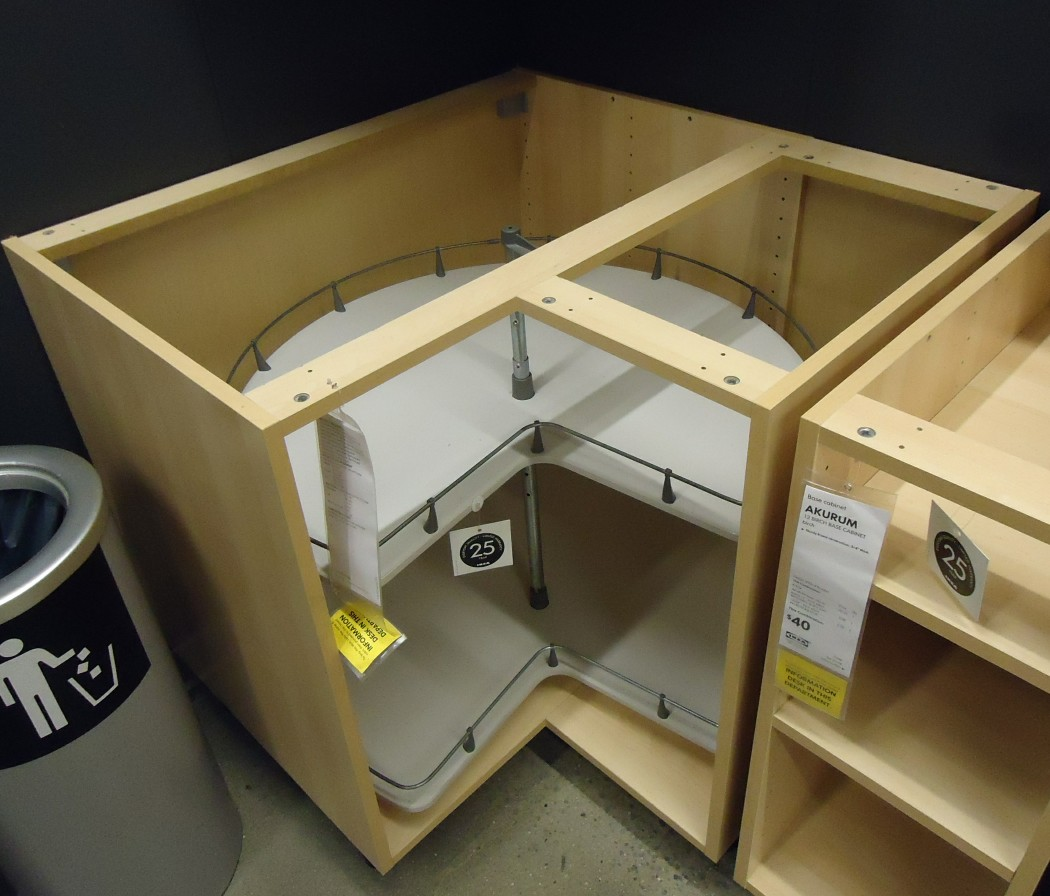
A corner cabinet with a turntable for easier access.

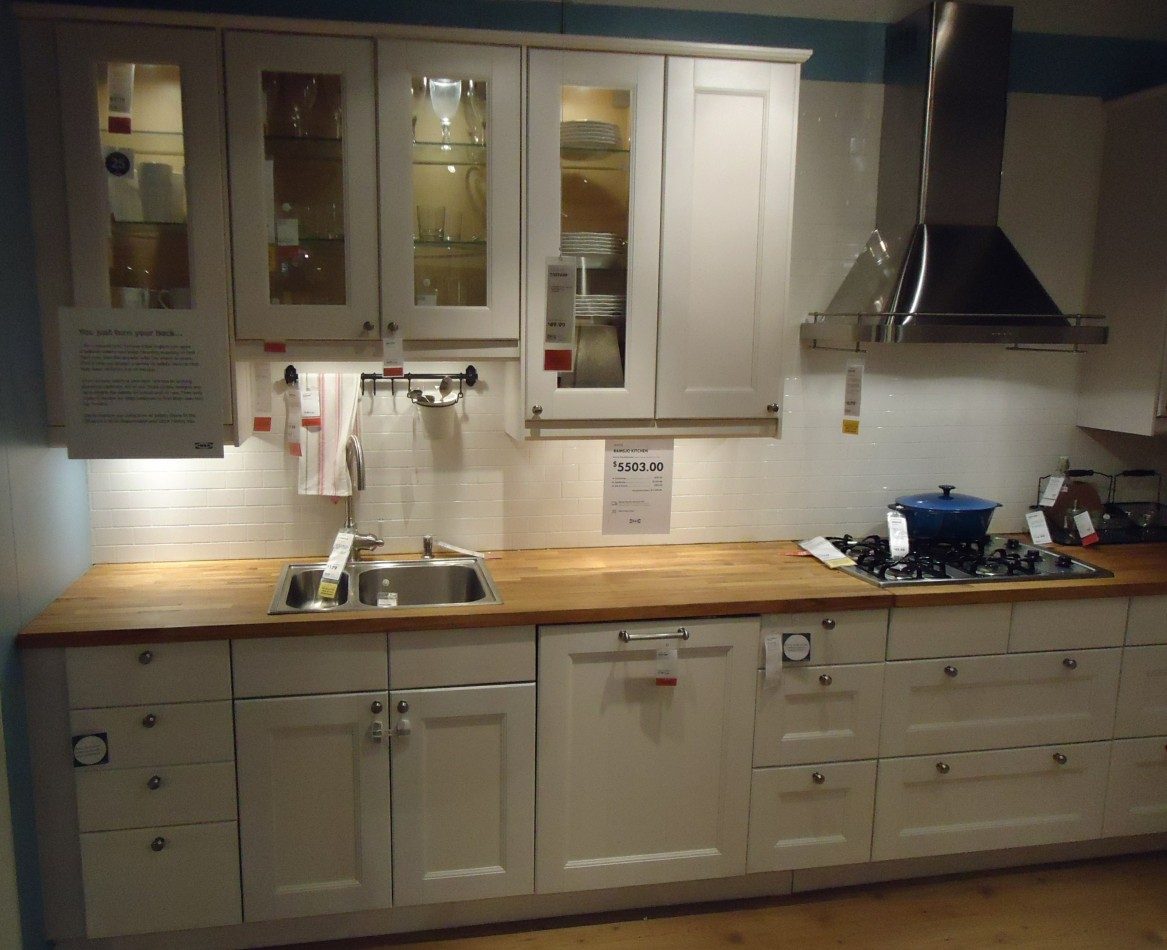
A design choice is integrating kitchen cabinets with appliances and other surfaces for a consistent look.

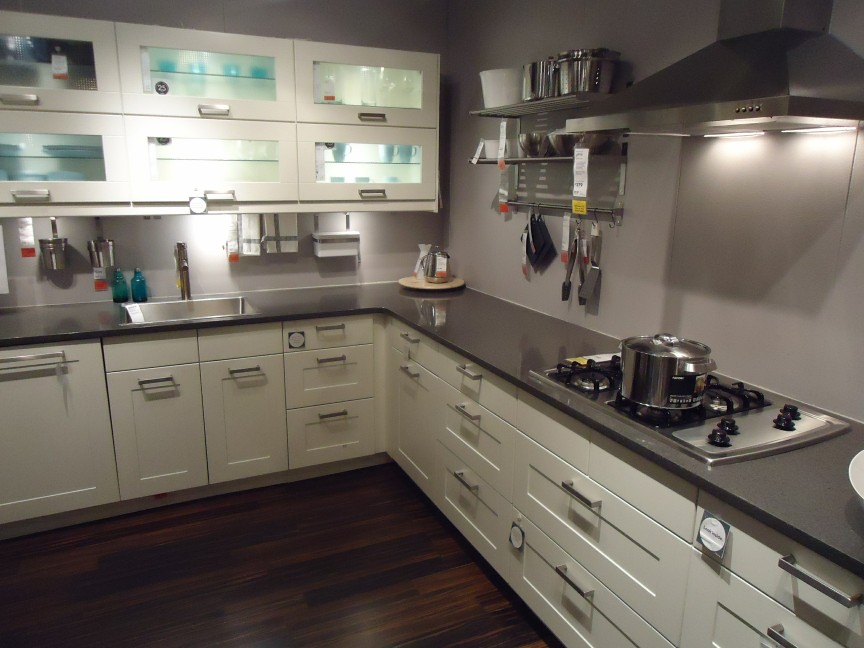
One trend is for more cabinets both below and above the countertop.

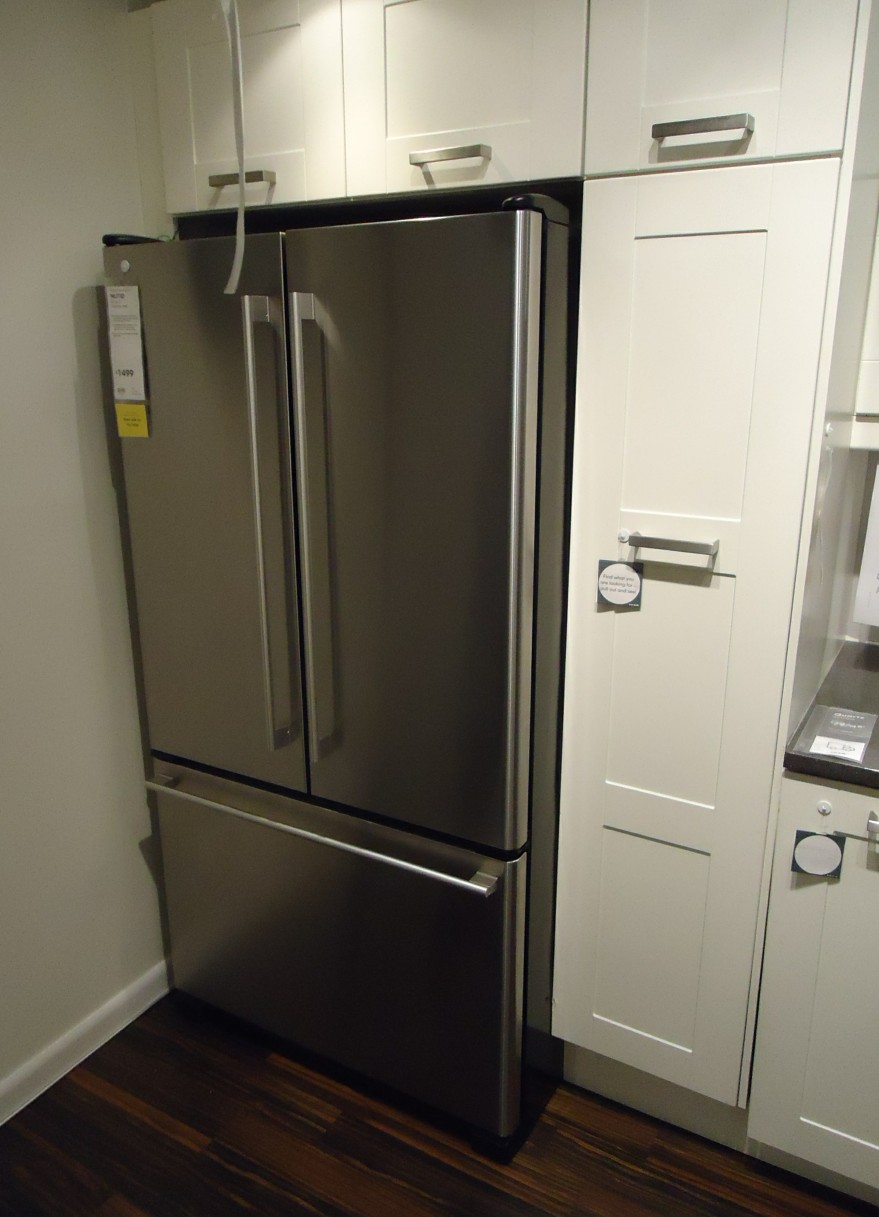
Cabinets can wrap around an appliance such as a refrigerator.

- Cabinet faces. Solid wood remains a popular choice for many cabinet parts, including bases, frames and doors. However, most commercial cabinets have sides, backs and bottoms made of plywood or particle board. Traditional-style solid-wood cabinetry is more expensive and many consumers opt for cabinets that incorporate many particle board or plywood components to reduce costs. Pricing for solid wood cabinet doors depends on the wood species used. For example, teak is more expensive than cherry, which is more expensive than maple, which is more expensive than oak. Similarly, solid wood is more expensive than plywood which, in turn, is more expensive than particle board or similar sheet goods.
- Cabinet body. The cabinet carcase is usually made from plywood or high-quality particle board, particularly for flat sections that do not need to be shaped, such as shelves, cabinet sides, or drawer bottoms. Typical plywood thickness in these applications varies from 3/8 in (9.5 mm) to 3/4 in (19 mm) [with 1/4 in (6.4 mm) used often for drawer bottoms]. Stiffness and strength are important factors since cabinets are expected to retain their shape over time and avoid bend or sag while continuing to support a heavy load. The best choices for strength are plywood and higher-quality particle board; they also have the benefit of being less susceptible to warping from moisture. Stiffness increases rapidly with shelf thickness; regardless of material choice, a 3/4-inch (19 mm) shelf is 73% stiffer than a 5/8-inch (16 mm) shelf, even though it is only 20% thicker. Shelves made of some particle board formulations, especially where not reinforced, may sag or deform. Particle board strength and rigidity varies by formulation and is determined by the resin used. Plywood carcases are usually assembled with screws and nails, while particle board carcases do not hold screws or nails as well and therefore are typically joined with glue, groove joints, or mechanical fasteners such as confirmat-cam assemblies. Generally, plywood-carcase cabinets are more expensive than particle-board-carcase cabinets.
- Cabinet frames and doors may be fashioned from solid wood (typically a species of hardwood), medium density fiberboard (MDF), particle board, plywood, or a combination, and may include lamination or a surface coating over these core materials. A floating panel in a door can be hardwood-veneer plywood captured within a solid wood or MDF frame. Solid wood and MDF can be edge-shaped, e.g., to round or pattern the edges of doors, drawer fronts, or face frames. Particle board, once manufactured, cannot be edge-shaped suitably. Plywood cannot be shaped without revealing its veneer core, often considered unsightly, though edge-shaped furniture-grade plywood with thin plies [ca. 1/16-inch (1.6 mm) ] is considered attractive for limited uses. MDF, once shaped, can be coated conformally with flexible veneers such as thermofoil or can be painted. It can also be covered with wood veneer or high-pressure laminate but only if the edge profile is square or approximately so (to within the veneer thickness). Today many cabinet doors and drawer fronts utilize an MDF core. Doors and drawer fronts may also be fashioned of particle board surfaced with high-pressure laminate. Natural wood offers its subtle combination of color, grain, pore pattern, variable absorption and smoothness of finish, and variation with viewing angle and lighting condition. The appearance of natural wood can only be achieved with solid wood components (wherever edges are shaped) or possibly veneer (where they are not); as already pointed out, the two approaches can be combined in a single cabinet. Various transparent grain-revealing finishes including shellac, lacquer, varnish, or polyurethane have been devised. A built-up finish may optionally utilize diverse pigments, dyes, bleaches, glazes, or wood fillers that may highlight contrasting colorants. Finishes can be applied by brush or spray and may comprise many separately applied layers. Accordingly, finishes formulated by differing manufacturers do not, in general, exactly match. Distressing the wood cabinets is another finish application and is often done in conjunction with glazes, stains, paints or dyes. This process consists of adding manufactured imperfections to cabinet doors to give the wood cabinets an aged, distressed, old-world rustic appearance. Common techniques include creating wormholes, rasping, dings and dents and sanding through the wood and layers of finish unevenly.
- Trade-off: solid wood versus particle board. Solid wood and plywood are durable and strong, but are more costly and offer less dimensional stability at manufacture than particle board. For cabinets and surface finishes that may sustain damage during long use, serviceability is a consideration. In case of damage, solid wood can be repaired by a qualified furniture refinisher, other than the manufacturer, to achieve a perfect match to the surrounding finish. Veneered MDF and particle board components, if damaged, must be replaced by the manufacturer. If water reaches the core, particleboard especially will swell irreversibly (therefore it is never used in home sheathing applications, where oriented strand board OSB is used instead). Tolerances for the use of screw fasteners in particleboard are tighter than for solid wood or plywood, and screws often loosen over time if over-torqued. However, MDF and particle board are good choices where cabinets are well-constructed, will be cared-for, where service life is projected as intermediate, e.g., where the kitchen will be remodeled approximately every 15 years, or where the manufacturer can be relied upon to supply replacement components if needed.

=== Sustainability and materials ===
Environmental considerations increasingly influence cabinet material choices. Manufacturers may use low-formaldehyde or formaldehyde-free composite woods, water-based finishes, and responsibly sourced timber to reduce environmental impact. Recycled materials, such as reclaimed wood or composite boards made from agricultural byproducts, are also becoming more common in sustainable kitchen cabinet production.

== Cabinet construction ==
=== Cabinet carcass ===
Cabinets may be either face-frame or frameless in construction. Each option provides features and drawbacks.

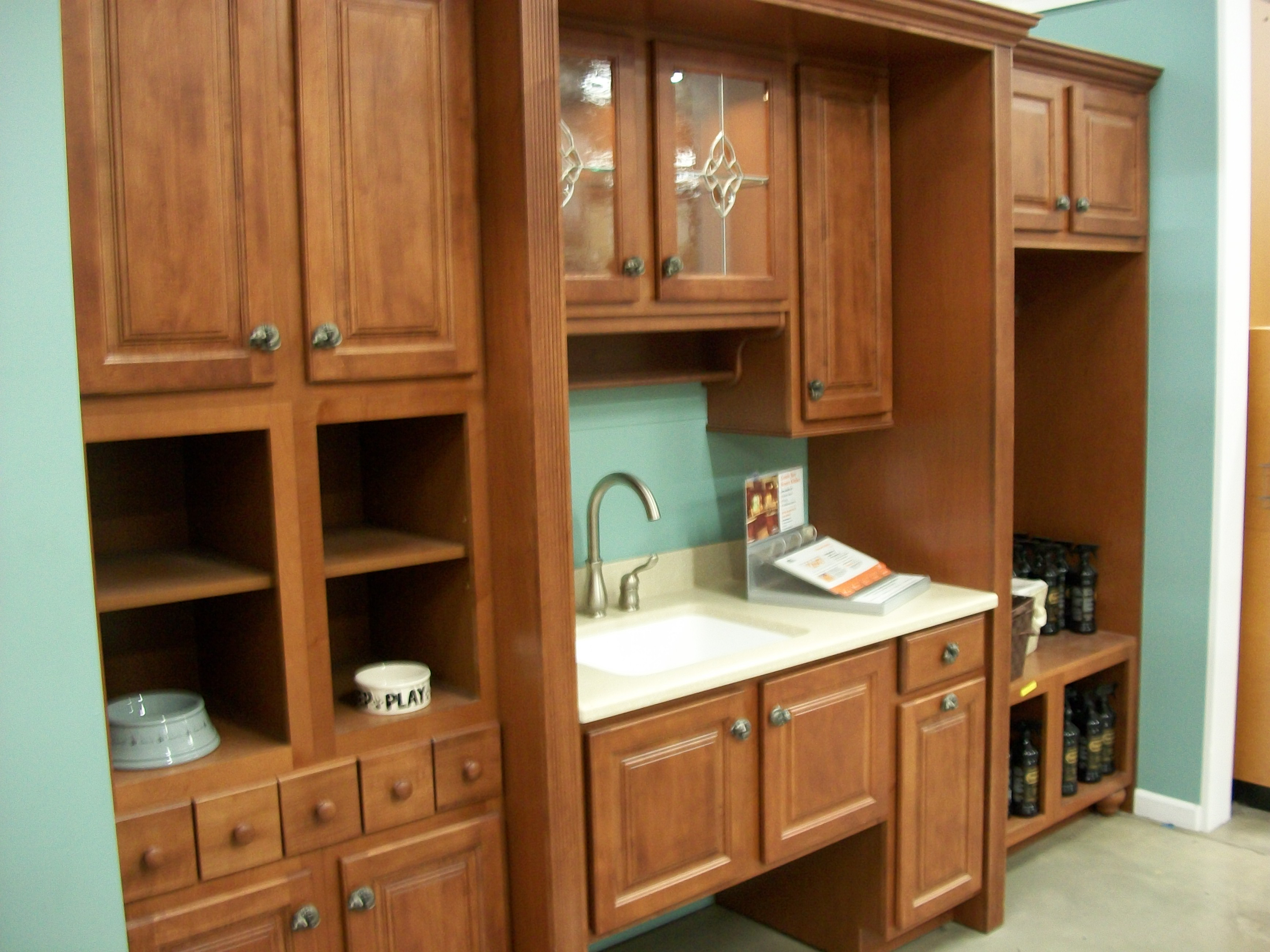
Most kitchen cabinets feature matching tops and bottoms and are available in different styles.

In Europe, there is a DIN standard dimension where the height of a base unit is 720mm + 150mm for the bottom plinth and 40mm for worktop thickness, providing a working surface height of 910mm with an area of 600mm x 600 mm. This "60cm square" horizontal area (or its multiples) accommodates many standard floor-standing electrical appliances.

- Face-frame cabinets. Traditional cabinets are constructed using face frames which typically consist of narrow strips of hardwood framing the cabinet box opening. Cabinet carcasses were traditionally constructed with a separate face frame until the introduction of modern engineered wood such as particle board and medium-density fiberboard along with glues, hinges and fasteners required to join them. A face frame ensures squareness of the cabinet front. It also increases rigidity and provides a mounting point for hinges. Face-frame cabinets retain popularity in the U.S. An important distinction between modern (manufactured) and traditional custom-built face-frame cabinets relates to the catalog-selection of cabinet components entailed by mass production. Original custom face-frame cabinets accommodated multiple sections (cavities) in a single carcass. But stock (or semi-custom) face-frame cabinets are constructed individually and joined during installation. As a result, modern face-frame cabinets differ in having significantly wider (double-width) stile materials overall after installation. Two 1 1/2-inch (38 mm) stiles joined as adjacent cabinets result in, effectively, a 3-inch (76 mm) stile. Wide stiles can interfere with access to the cabinet interior. When base cabinets were typically shelved, this was not much of a drawback. But with base cabinets increasingly being fitted with trays and drawers (using modern hardware), the extra stile width results in significantly less access to the cabinet cavity space. This drawback does not pertain to custom face-frame cabinets.

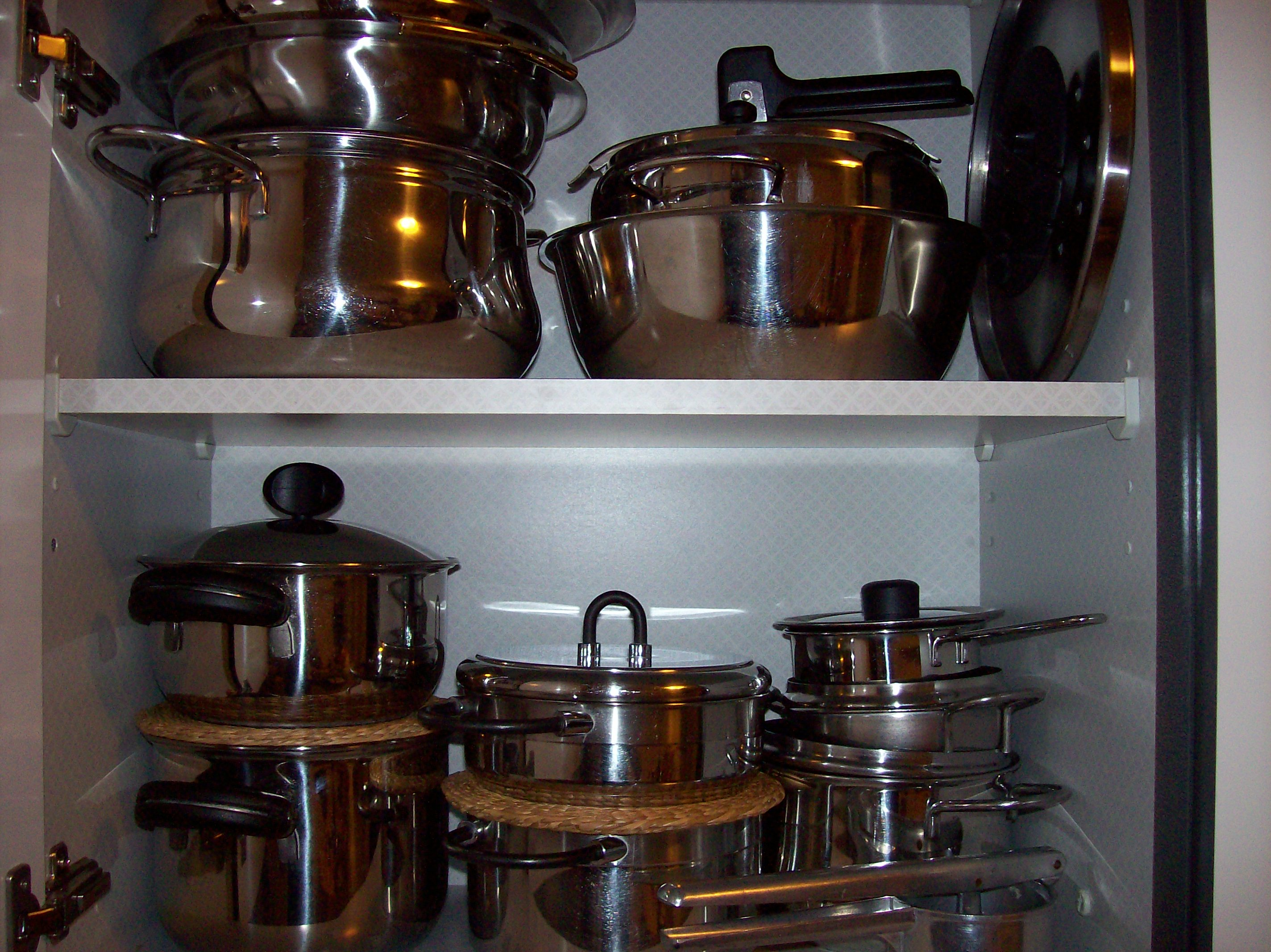
Most kitchen cabinets have peg-holes on either side within the cabinet allowing for adjustable shelf height.

- Custom. Custom face-frame cabinets offer more efficient use of space because double width stiles (see above) can be avoided. They also provide far greater flexibility with regard to materials and design, since kitchen cabinet heights, widths and depths can be designed and produced according to the client's specifications. Every aspect of custom cabinetry can be made to specifications, which makes it both the most desirable and the most expensive choice in the majority of kitchen installations.

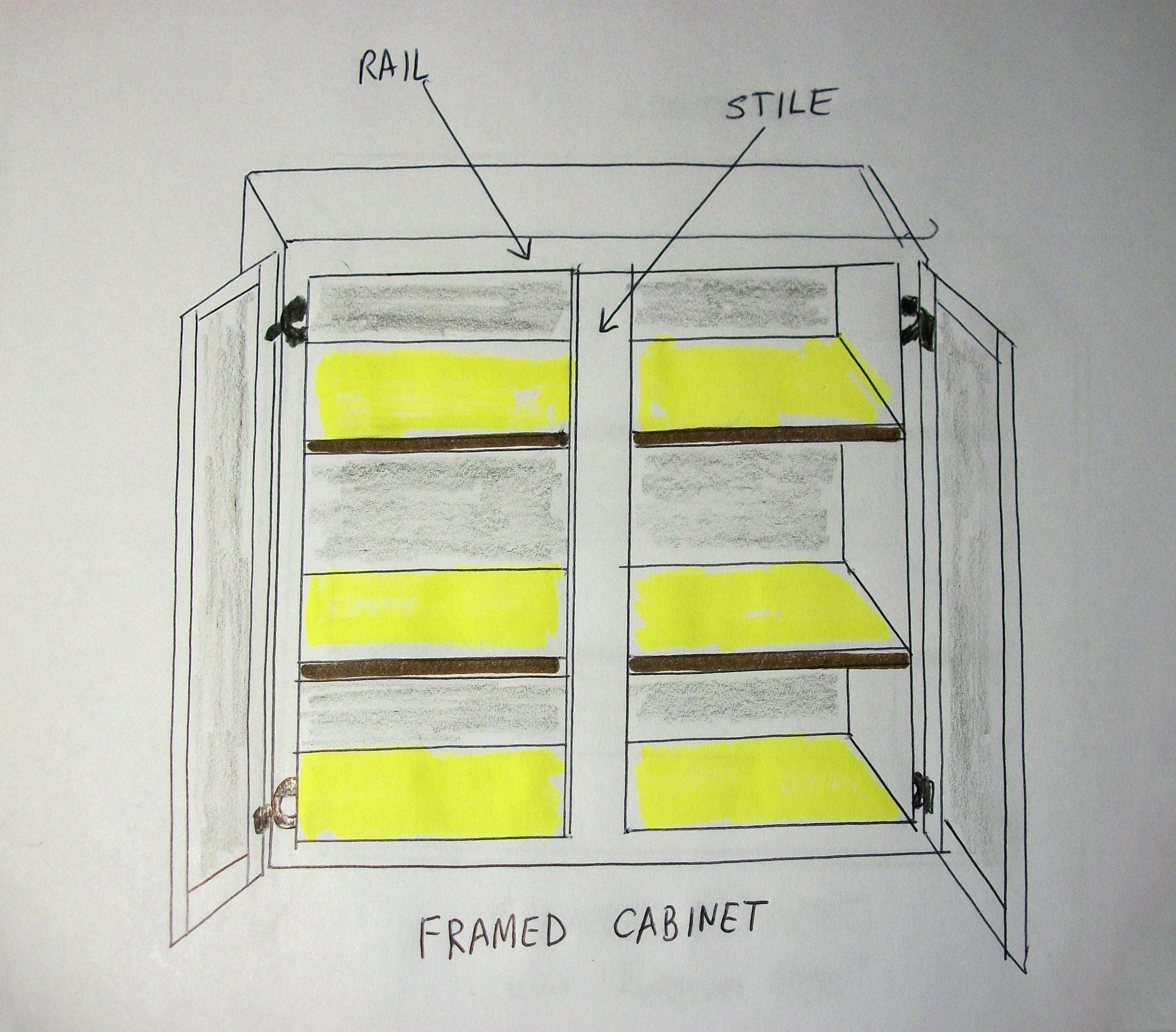
Framed cabinets have a center stile. Hinges are mounted to the outer cabinet.

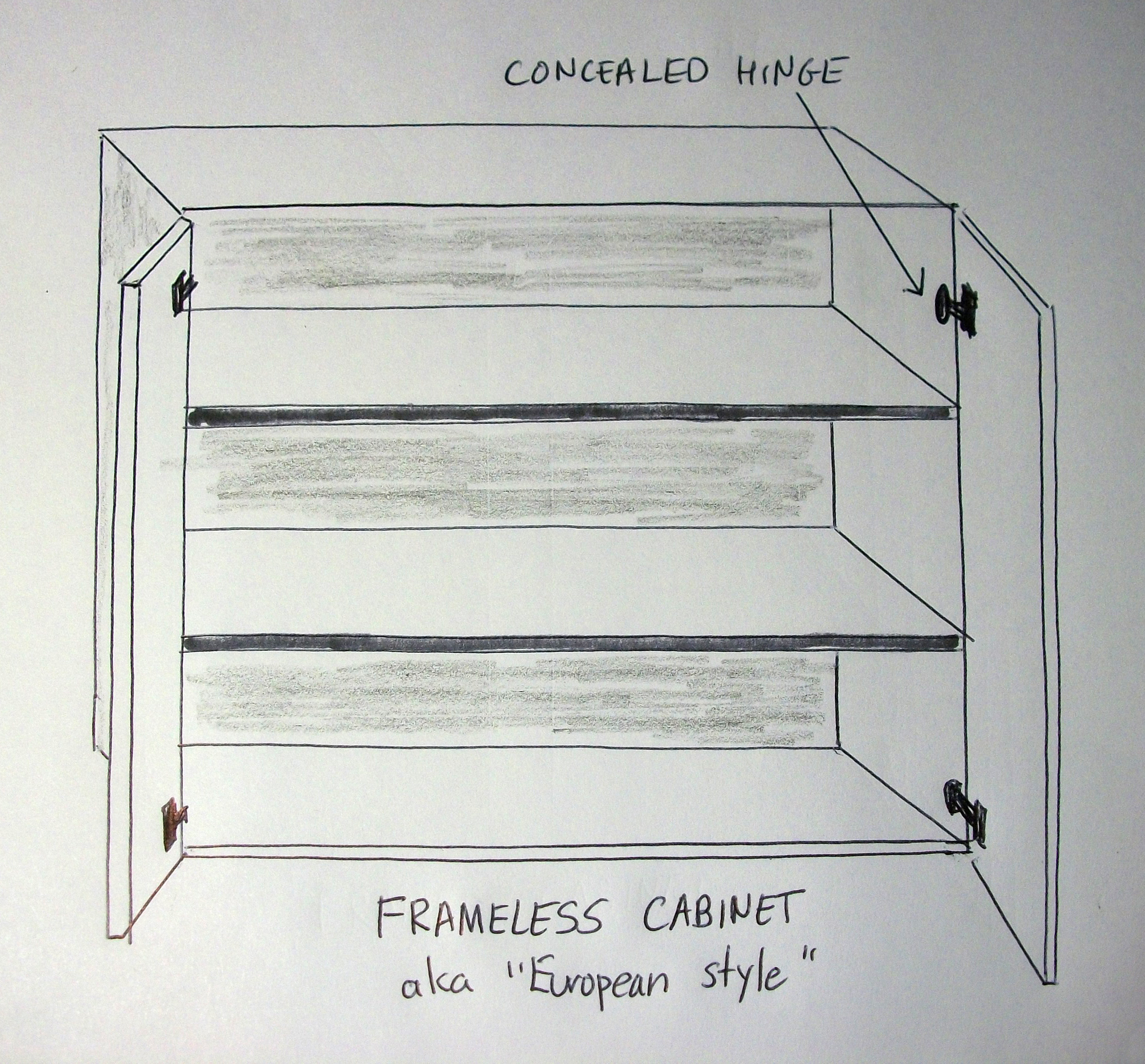
Frameless cabinets, also known as "European style", lack a center stile, and typically have concealed hinges mounted to each inside wall.

- Frameless (full-access) cabinets. Frameless (a.k.a. "full-access") cabinets utilize the carcase side, top, and bottom panels to serve same functions as do face-frames in traditional cabinets. In general, frameless cabinets provide better utilization of space than face-frame cabinets. A preference for frameless cabinet design developed in Europe in the 1950s and 1960s following the devastation of World War II and the increasing cost of lumber. A burgeoning market for reconstructed housing in Central Europe offered a fertile environment for developments in efficient hinge and cabinet designs. Frameless cabinets rely on manufacturing methods that permit the production of modern cabinet hardware (hinges and slides) and engineered wood products (for strength, dimensional tolerance, and stability). The intent of the frameless design is to achieve a more streamlined appearance and a more efficient use of space, with ergonomically designed moving components such as drawers, trays, and pull-out cabinets providing better access to interior components. A number of benefits stemming from frameless cabinet design have been successfully applied to face-frame cabinets, such as multiple drawers in base cabinets, full-overlay doors, and cup hinges. With the rise in popularity of European style frameless cabinetry, a significant proportion of the hardware used by U.S. cabinet manufacturers is imported from Europe.

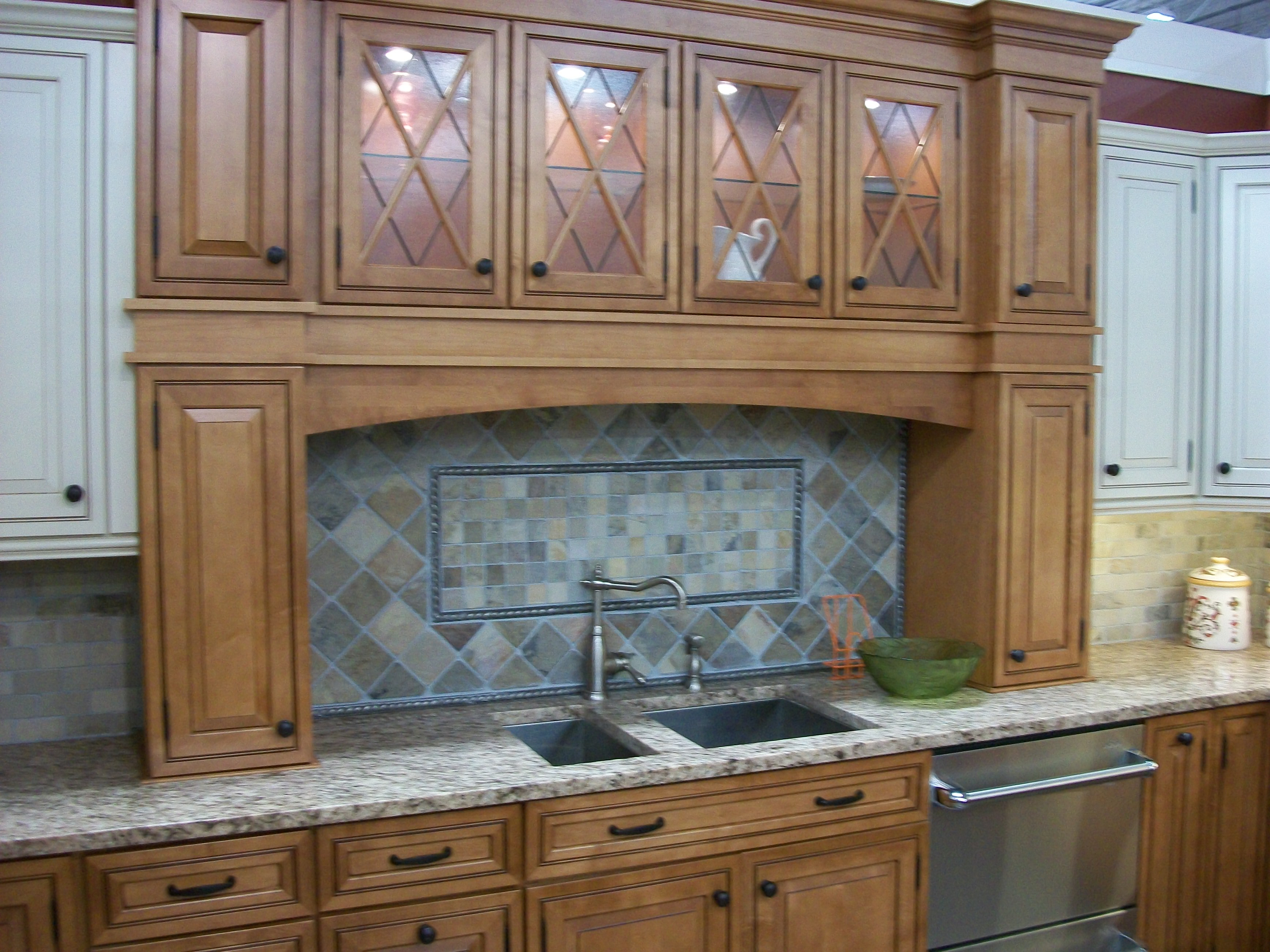
A kitchen cabinet display in a store in 2009 in New Jersey.

=== Cabinet details ===
- Door Mounting. For both face-frame and frameless kitchen cabinets, it is conventional for cabinet doors to overlay the cabinet carcase. Face-frame cabinets allow for various door mounting options. Traditional overlay doors do not abut, allowing a partial view of the face frames when the doors are closed. Full overlay cabinet doors fit closely so that they obscure the face frame when closed. A third and less conventional option for face-frame cabinets is to inset doors into, and flush with, the face frame (see below). Since frameless (see below) cabinet doors also fully overlay their carcases, the two types (frameless and full-overlay face-frame cabinets) have a similar installed appearance (when doors are closed), both may use European cup hinges, and both tend to use decorative door and drawer pulls (since there is no room for fingers at the door or drawer edge when installed).
- Space-utilization. Since typical face-frames are 1 1/2 inches (38 mm) wide and frameless side panels 3/4 inch (19 mm), access to the cabinet interior is 1 1/2 inches (38 mm) wider for a typical frameless cabinet relative to a face-frame cabinet. A 12-inch-wide (300 mm) cabinet accommodates a 10-inch-wide (250 mm) drawer in frameless construction or a 8 1/2-inch-wide (220 mm) drawer in framed construction. The 1 1/2-inch (38 mm) difference is most significant for narrower face-frame cabinets. Hence, the nomenclature "full-access." Custom (higher-cost) face-frame cabinets, which use one 1 1/2-inch (38 mm) stile to frame two cabinet openings, can also accommodate wider drawers comparable to frameless cabinets. Frameless wall-oven cabinetry further saves 3 inches (76 mm) of wall space as compared to the same wall-oven installed in a face-frame cabinet, Many, if not most, contemporary ovens (and other cabinet-front-mounted major appliances) have been designed with the space-utilization advantage of frameless cabinets installation in mind. The oven is dimensioned, and thermally insulated, to fit within an industry-standard external width [e.g., 27 or 30 inches (690 or 760 mm)] cabinet cavity, less two standard 3/4-inch (19 mm) cabinet side-wall thicknesses while providing for a small space between the oven box and the internal cabinet wall. In ovens, the bezel is sized to fit the full external cavity width and overlay the cabinet side wall. Such an installation avoids any unused lateral space around the oven. (While, hypothetically, ovens can be installed similarly in face-frame cabinets, such an installation may requires cutting away all but 3/4 inch (19 mm) of each 1 1/2-inch (38 mm) face-frame – specifically not recommended by vendors as it may weaken the joint between side-wall and face-frame – and buttressing face-frame cabinet side walls accordingly.)
- Wood options. Frameless cabinets, which exhibit a modern appearance in keeping with the design movement of "minimalism," are typically constructed of particle board, which features a high degree of dimensional stability, adherence to dimensional standards, absence of warping, uniformity, and a lower cost than solid wood and is very strong. Accordingly, the so-called European hinge includes a 35-mm-diameter cup press-fit to a bored recess particularly well-suited to particle board construction. By virtue of the 35-mm "European" cup design, European hinges avoided reliance on screws as a primary mechanism holding the cabinet door to the hinge. Nearly all non-custom framed and frameless cabinetry now use this 35-mm cup design. Plywood and/or solid wood can also be used in frameless cabinet construction, generally at a higher cost.
- Hinge design features. Those European hinges intended for use with frameless cabinets afford a quick-release mechanism enabling a door to be removed and replaced without the use of tools. Such hinges typically afford six-way (three-axis) positional adjustment by screwdriver for door alignment. Some accommodate complex motions to avoid interfering with interior cabinet components while fully overlaying the carcases (e.g., permitting the full-interior-cabinet-width dimensions for pull-out trays). Scissors-type articulating hinges support wide-angle non-interfering adjacent doors.
- Inset door face-frame cabinetry. A special, and unconventional, category of framed cabinets is represented by those with inset doors. An inset-mounted cabinet door is fitted to the frame in the same way as a typical room door is fitted to the doorway; such doors fit into a frame when closed. (Full-size doors do not simply cover the opening between rooms or at an entrance to a building.) Inset doors require more precise alignment of each door to the containing frame. Further, this alignment must be maintained with use. Upon opening or closing, inset doors are gently braked by the air cushion trapped between the door and frame. This desirable feature is one hallmark of high-quality inset door construction. Frameless or full-overlay face-frame construction can superficially resemble inset construction when doors are designed to fit closely within a cavity formed by surrounding doors, drawers, and/or an adjacent counter top.

=== Cabinet doors ===
Cabinet doors may feature a variety of materials such as wood, metal or glass. Wood may be solid wood ("breadboard" construction) or engineered wood or may be mixed (e.g. engineered wood panel in a solid wood frame)

- Frames. In the U.S. solid wood frame and panel construction, using either mortise and tenon or cope and stick jointed frames, is traditional, with maple, cherry, oak, birch, and hickory among the most commonly used species. Mortise-and-tenon frames, with their greater strength and permanence, are more costly to produce and less commonly used as compared to cope-and-stick frames. As an alternative, miter joint frames, which may be identifiable by face-surface relief that follows continuously around the frame, have become popular. Miter-jointed frames typically employ embedded metal fasteners to secure frames elements (stiles and rails) cut at a 45° angle. Captured within frames, panels may be either solid or veneered engineered wood (either particle board or medium density fiberboard). Laminates, including those designed to resemble hardwood, can typically be identified by a more rounded appearance associated with the minimum bending radii necessarily entailed by the manufacturing process of applying laminate to an underlying substrate. By comparison, solid surfaces, and solid hardwoods in particular, can be milled with more sharply defined corners, edges, or grooves on either a panel or frame.
- Panels. Panels used in frame-and-panel kitchen cabinet doors may be fashioned either of solid wood or covered by paint, veneer, or laminate in which case they are fashioned of engineered wood. The panels are typically not fastened with glue or nails but rather "float" within the frame to accommodate seasonal expansion or contraction of the wood frame.
- Solid-door construction. Doors may be fabricated of solid material, either engineered wood (particle board or medium-density fiberboard, but not typically plywood) or solid wood. Engineered wood panels may either be used as slabs or may be shaped to resemble frame-and-panel construction. In either case, engineered wood panels are generally painted, veneered, or laminated. Solid wood panels are typically formed of multiple boards of the selected wood species, jointed together using glue and may either be painted or finished. Solid wood construction offers the possibility of refinishing in case of damage or wear.
- Decorative panels. Cabinet doors panels can be used decoratively on cabinet sides, where exposed, for a more finished appearance.
- Glass door construction options. Doors may have glass windows constructed of muntins and mullions holding glass panels (as in exterior windows). Other designs either mimic the divided-light look of muntins and mullions with overlays, or may dispense with them altogether. Cabinets using glass doors sometimes use glass shelves and interior lighting from the top of a cabinet. A glass shelf allows light to reach throughout a cabinet. For a special display effect, the interior rear of a cabinet may be covered with a mirrors to further distribute light.

=== Drawers and trays ===
A functional design objective for cabinet interiors involves maximization of useful space and utility in the context of the kitchen workflow. Drawers and trays in lower cabinets permit access from above and avoid uncomfortable or painful crouching.

In face-frame construction, a drawer or tray must clear the face-frame stile and is 2 inches (51 mm) narrower than the available cabinet interior space. The loss of 2 inches is particularly noticeable and significant for kitchens including multiple narrow [15-inch (380 mm) or less] cabinets.

In frameless construction, drawer boxes may be sized nearly to the interior opening of the cabinet providing better use of the available space.

However, the same is not true for trays. Even in the case of frameless construction doors and their hinges when open block a portion of the interior cabinet width. Since trays are mounted behind the door, trays are typically significantly narrower than drawers. Special hinges are available that can permit trays of similar width as drawers but they have not come into wide use.

Shelves provide in all cases more storage space than drawers or trays, but are less accessible.

=== Wall oven cabinets ===
Stock wall-oven cabinets may be adapted to built-in ovens, coffee-makers, or other appliances by removing portions of the cabinet and adding trim panels to achieve a flush installation.

Frameless cabinets provide for wall oven front panel widths equal to the cabinet width (see above). In such an installation the oven front panel occupies a similar profile as a cabinet door. Accordingly, frameless installations for wall-oven make most efficient use of the available wall space in a kitchen.

This effect is difficult to achieve in typical face-frame cabinet installations, as it requires modification to the face-frame (essentially eliminating the face-frame at the oven cut-out).

== Cabinet finishes ==
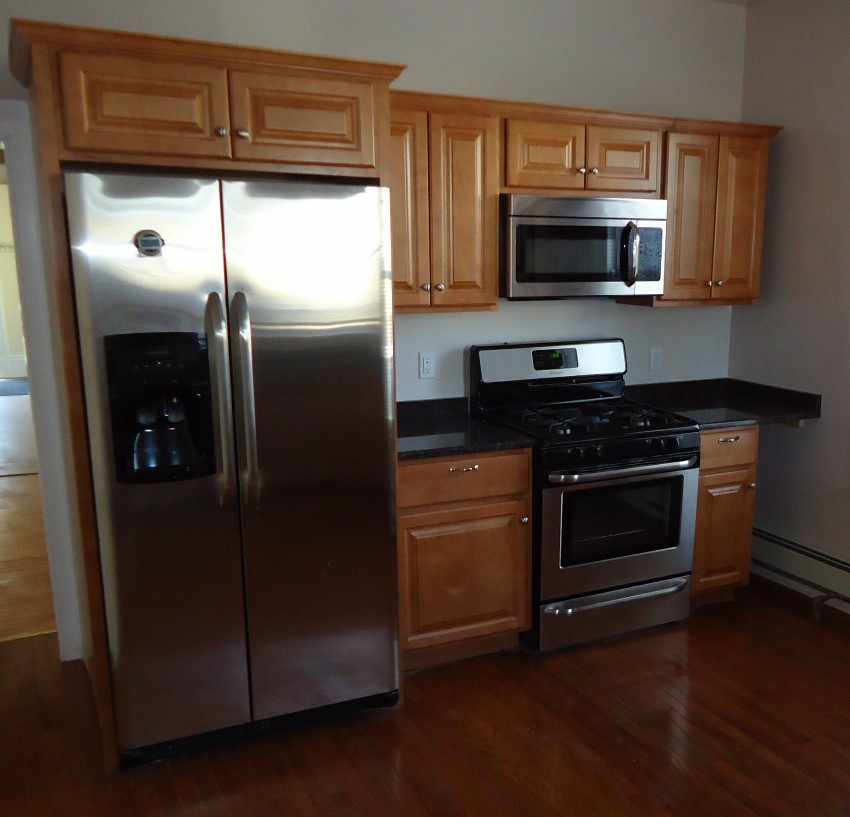
Stainless steel built-in appliances around kitchen cabinets.

Cabinets may be finished with opaque paint, opaque lacquer and transparent finishes such as lacquer or varnish. Decorative finishes include distressing, glazing, and toning. The choice of finish can affect the cabinet's color, sheen (from flat to high gloss), and feel.

- High-pressure laminates or (HPL) are made from resin and paper components under high pressure; in contrast, ordinary wood does not sustain such pressures, and can be crushed to less than half its natural thickness in a hand-operated arbor press. The high pressure squeezes the HPL to such a solid density that it becomes highly resistant to damage simply because any utensil or tool striking the HPL will not have a force greater than the force used to form the HPL itself. In effect, the HPL has been dented in advance. HPL can be decorated in any pattern and is applied using contact cement and pressed in place using a "J-roller." It is cut slightly larger than the panel on which it is to be installed and trimmed using a router-like laminate trimmer along the edge. It may also be filed to obtain the final edge. While HPL became prevalent in the twentieth century, since the 1970s the trend has been away from HPL in favor of wood.
- Melamine is a coating for furniture board panels in carcases. Its unique white-in-color chemical formulation helps prevent damage by chemicals and gives it impact resistance comparable to HPL. Melamine coated boards are widely available in home centers for purposes such as shelving.
- Thermofoil is a plastic coating laminate applied to furniture-board. It is typically applied to boards which have been milled, shaped, or routed into a complex profile. While thermofoil can have a unique glossy sheen and have strength and impact resistance almost as much as HPL, it can't be repaired if damaged.
- Paint is usually applied to maple cabinet doors or to MDF (Medium-density fibreboard) with a spray gun as opposed to a paint brush or roller, in order to achieve a smooth coating. Most large-scale cabinet makers apply one or two coats of primer before the paint as well as a protective coat of lacquer afterwards.
- Stain is a water or thinner based dye that allows for the grain of the wood to show through. When it comes to application there are two main categories of staining. wiping stains and spray stains. Wiping stains are sprayed on to the Wood and then wiped off whereas the spray stain is left to dry without wiping. One thing to keep in mind when it comes to staining it would is that the color of the wood also affects the end result. For example, a stain on oak will not be the same color as the same stain on Maple.

== Cabinet hardware ==
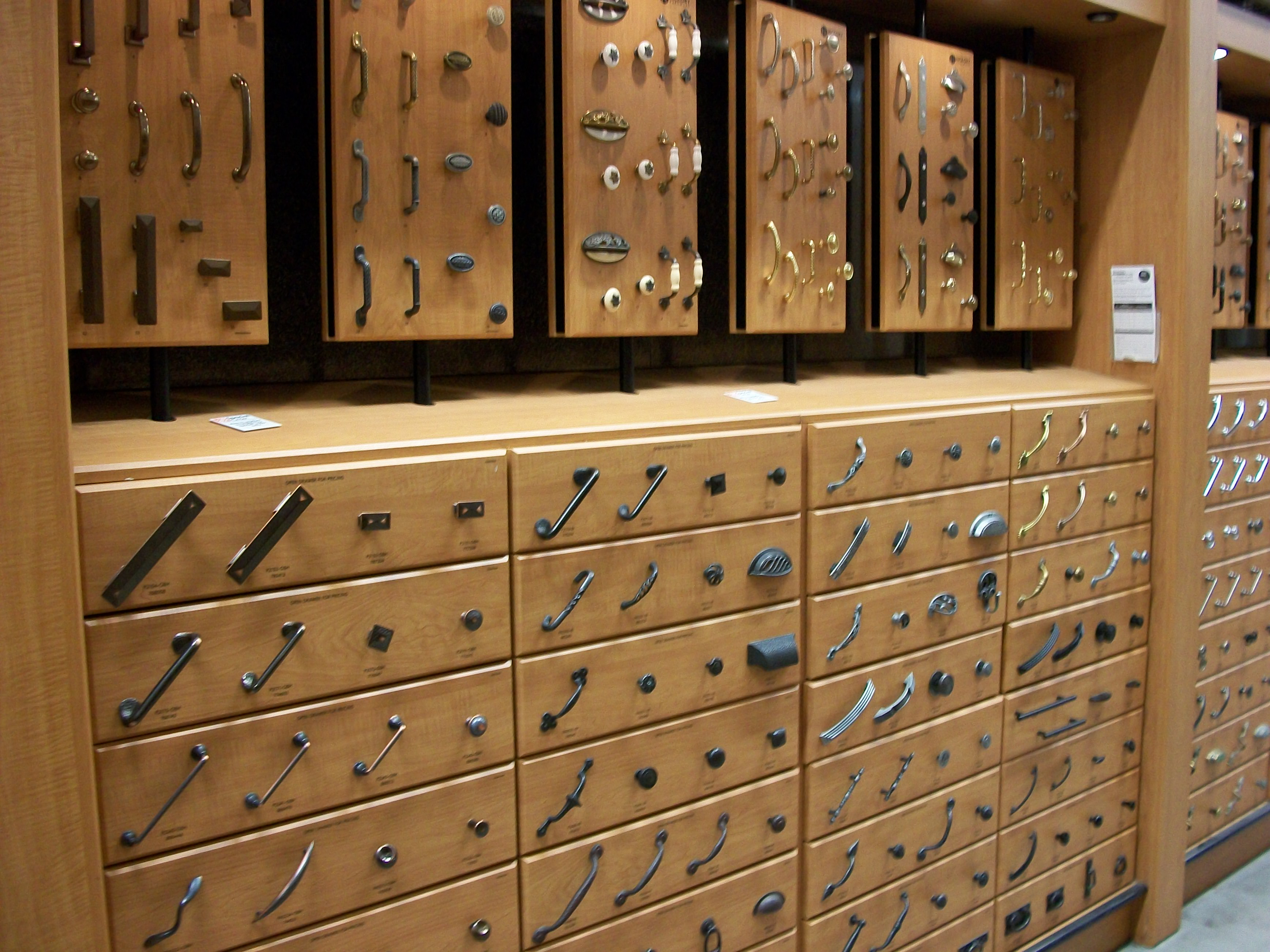
There are many kitchen cabinet hardware options available.

Hardware is the term used for metal fittings incorporated into a cabinet extraneous of the wood or engineered wood substitute and the countertop. The most basic hardware consists of hinges and drawer/door pulls, although only hinges are an absolute necessity for a cabinet since pulls can be fashioned of wood or plastic, and drawer slides were traditionally fashioned of wood. In a modern kitchen it is highly unusual to use wood for a drawer slides owing to the much superior quality of metal drawer slides/sides.

=== Drawers and trays ===
Drawers and trays make it easier to access a cabinet's contents. They are a substantial benefit because they reduce bending and squatting. The only drawback is slightly less usable space which is taken up by the slides as well as door clearances. A typical drawer is 5 inches (130 mm) narrower than a comparable shelf. A drawer can usually hold about 75 to 100 lb (34 to 45 kg) for ordinary use. Using slides, mounted on the side (reducing width slightly) or bottom (completely out of sight), a drawer or tray can be extended considerably with a smooth, linear motion using minimum effort.

Drawer extension is the exposed proportion of a fully extended drawer. Traditional drawers with wood-on-wood runners can only be extended about three-quarters; however, modern runners enable full-extension drawers. A slide's design parameters are its height, depth, extension, weight rating, durability, serviceability, and smoothness of operation.

=== Soft close and push to open ===
New varieties of hinges and slides have been developed that enhance the action and usability of doors and drawers.

- Soft Close is one of the most widely used hardware upgrade, a system where once a door/drawer is pushed to close, a mechanism slows the momentum of the door/drawer, closing it gently and quietly. This system is beneficial in reducing slamming doors, injuries to children and wear and tear on the cupboard.
- Push to Open is another common hardware option, this mechanism allows people to simply push the cabinet door, where a spring-loaded mechanism then opens the door without the need for handles. This option is used in high end kitchens where a clean, handle-less look is desired.

=== Specialty hardware ===
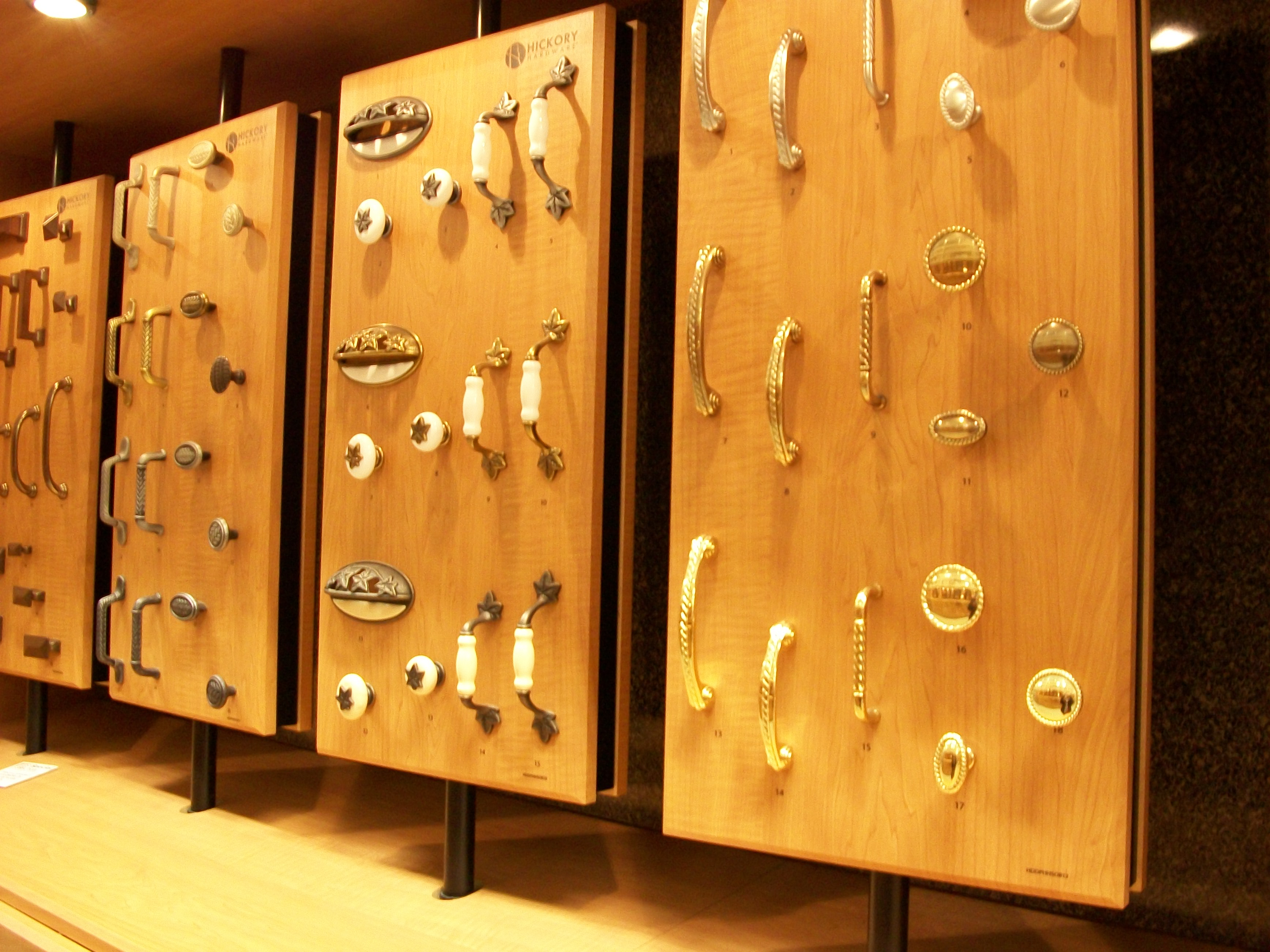
Kitchen cabinet hardware.

There is a large variety of specialty hardware for kitchen cabinets. Special hardware for corner and other blind cabinets makes their contents more easily accessible. They may be in the form of lazy susans with or without a wedge cut out or of tray slides which enable the hidden corner space to be occupied with trays that slide both laterally and forwards/backwards. Sponge drawers use special hinges that fit between the cabinet front and the sink. Pull down or lift up hardware are used for inaccessible places.

== Buying cabinets ==
Before buying cabinets, precise measurements are essential otherwise there may be un-utilized space, cabinets may not fit, or there may be interference between various elements of the kitchen, such as doors and drawers. Note that European cabinets typically have different sizes than ones in North America, and are typically built in multiples of 100mm, with 600mm wide being a common size.

Buyers can buy pre-built "stock" cabinets for fast delivery which usually arrive in a week or less. In contrast, custom-made cabinets can have longer delivery times, such as four weeks.

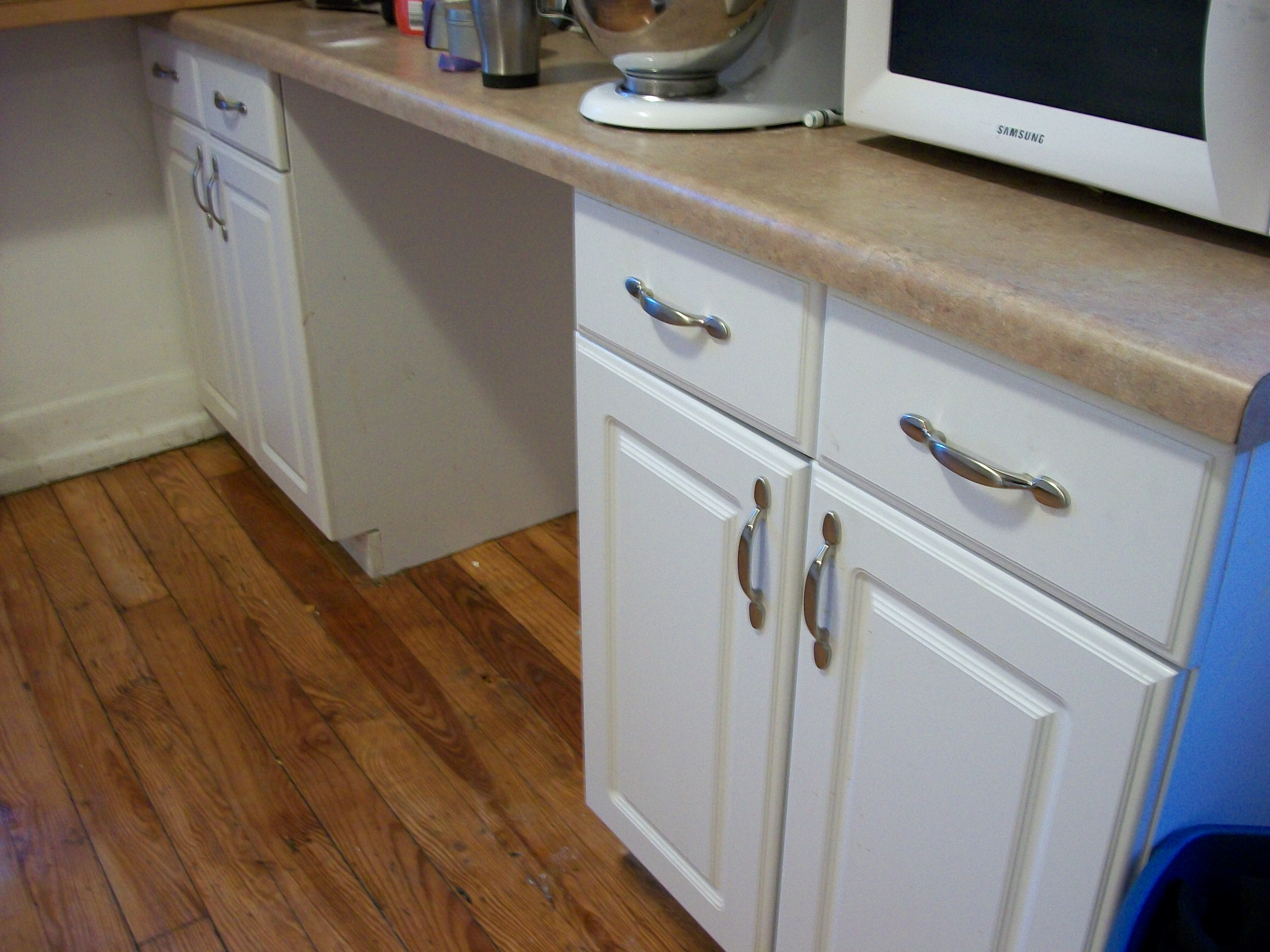
Stock kitchen cabinets available from a home center can be installed by yourself or a handyman.

- Base cabinets are usually 24 inches (610 mm) deep and 34 1/2 inches (880 mm) high to accommodate a countertop surface normally 36 inches (910 mm) above the floor.
- Wall cabinets are usually 12 inches (300 mm) deep. Their heights are often 30 inches (760 mm), for example, if mounted to a soffit. In a kitchen with 8-foot-high (2.4 m) ceilings, a 36-inch-high (910 mm) wall cabinet will leave about 6 inches (150 mm) of space above the cabinet which can be covered with a crown molding; a full 42-inch-high (1,100 mm) wall cabinet will run straight to the top of the ceiling. Wall cabinets are sometimes called "upper cabinets." The distance from countertop to wall cabinet is usually 18 inches (460 mm), but this distance is sometimes less if there is undercabinet lighting. Cabinets can have an open top for displaying ornaments. Ceilings higher than 9 feet (2.7 m) can permit another level of cabinets.

Cabinet dimensions are specified with width first, height second, depth last. The width–height–depth is a generally accepted convention. A 18x36x12 cabinet is therefore 18 inches (460 mm) wide, 36 inches (910 mm) tall, and 12 inches (300 mm) deep. Sometimes upper cabinets are presumed to be 12 inches (300 mm) deep, so only the width and height are given. For example, a "W1836" label means wall-mounted cabinet [12 inches (300 mm) deep] is 18 inches (460 mm) wide and 36 inches (910 mm) high.

Custom cabinetry, while expensive, can fit the available space attractively, and can fit into walls which aren't exactly flat or straight. They can combine more than one opening and eliminate unsightly doubled stiles in face-frame installations as well as bring aesthetic appeal using unusual woods or finishes. Custom cabinets sometimes offer inset cabinet doors, and can match existing or period furniture styles. It's sometimes possible to mix custom and stock cabinetry which have identical finishes.

Cabinets can be purchased from specialty retailers, kitchen remodelers, home centers, on-line retailers, and ready-to-assemble furniture manufacturers. Some installers offer a package deal from measurement, to construction, to installation.

Cabinets are sometimes delivered in fully assembled form. Carcasses should be inspected carefully before installation, since defects are difficult to repair after installation. Ready-to-assemble furniture cabinets are lower-in-cost and are delivered in a flat box. Some courses teach homeowners how to build their own cabinets.

== See also ==
- Wall oven

== Bibliography ==
- Mary Drake McFeely, Can She Bake a Cherry Pie?: American Women and the Kitchen in the Twentieth Century
- Dolores Hayden, The Grand Domestic Revolution: A History of Feminist Designs for American Homes, Neighborhoods and Cities
- Nancy Carlisle, et al. America's Kitchens
- Ruth Oldenziel, ed, Cold War Kitchen: Americanization, Technology, and European Users
- Ellen Lupton, The Bathroom, the Kitchen, and the Aesthetics of Waste
- Mary Snodgrass, Encyclopedia of Kitchen History
