= Coping (joinery) =

Shaping the end of a moulding or frame component to fit a similar component

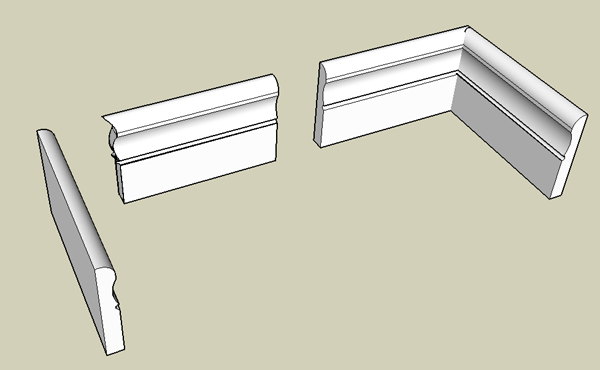
A coped joint for baseboards

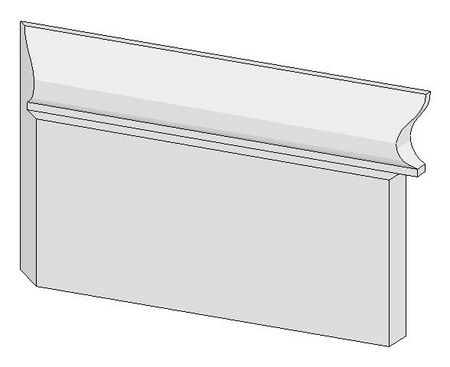
A scribed joint (right end of sketch) is derived from an internal mitre cut (left end) by cutting along the inner face of the mitre cut perpendicular to the board, typically with a coping saw.

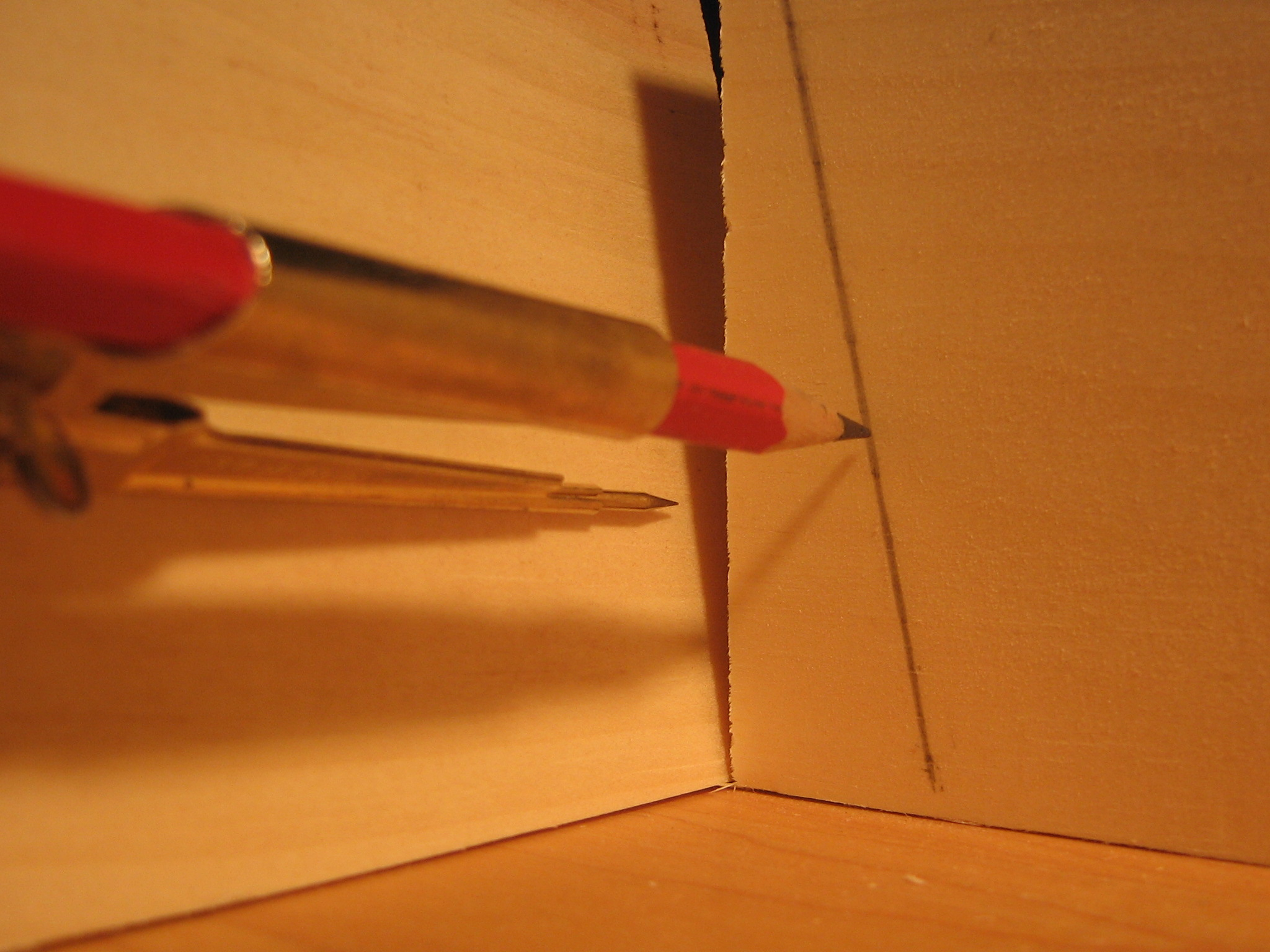
Scribing a pencil line to fit two pieces of wood together.

Coping or scribing is the woodworking technique of shaping the end of a moulding or frame component to neatly fit the contours of an abutting member. Joining tubular members in metalworking is also referred to as a cope, or sometimes a "fish mouth joint" or saddle joint.

Most English-speaking countries outside the United States use the terms scribe and scribing.

Coping is commonly used in the fitting of skirting and other mouldings in a room. It allows for clean joints between intersecting members when walls are not square to each other. The other method of fitting these mouldings that is commonly used is the mitre joint, but this technique relies upon knowing the precise angle between the walls for neat results. Coping is only ever used for internal corners. External corners are always mitred.

The main reason that scribed joints are used is that timber shrinks in width far more than it does in length. By using a scribed joint rather than an internal mitre joint, the effect of shrinkage is minimised. Also it is possible to arrange the scribed joints pointing away from the most common viewpoint (usually the doorway of a room) and so present the best appearance.

Coping is also commonly used in cabinet-making for mouldings and frame components. The rails in the frame and panel construction are commonly cope cut to fit the profile of the stiles. The technique is also common in the construction of doors and windows.

Scribe joinery is also commonly used in the building of log homes. The shape of the log underneath is scribed into the bottom of a log to be placed on top. This provides a tight seal between the two adjacent logs. It is also commonly used in the building of boats since there is rarely a straight edge but frequently many curves.

Traditionally, coping would be performed using a coping saw. There are also mechanical means of producing coped joints, including matching rail and stile cutters for the router as used in frame and panel construction.

== See also ==
- Cope and stick
