= Thermofoil =

Surface decorative techniques

Thermofoil, also known as RTF (rigid thermofoil), is a PVC film that is thermoformed and vacuum formed onto cabinet components made of medium-density fiberboard (MDF), a type of engineered wood. The heat softens the film, allowing it to conform to the shaped MDF surface. As MDF can be machined with a router into profiles resembling frame and panel doors, the finish produces a seamless, molded look that simulates traditional cabinetry details.

Often used for making kitchen cabinet doors, this reasonably priced and commonly available synthetic material is a thin, tight, heat-sealed plastic wrap used to mold over an MDF substrate. Thermofoil cabinet doors can be a solid color or imitation wood grain. The cabinet boxes that accompany these doors can be finished in various materials such matching thermofoil, coordinating paint, and laminates. Thermofoil is available in a range of textures and sheen levels, the most popular choice being solid white with a matte sheen.

Later innovations incorporate specialized topcoat primers that enable glazing directly on the surface. Some also feature embossing, or “ticking,” which simulates the appearance of natural wood grain. Softer formulations enhance the tactile experience, producing a surface that more closely resembles the feel of wood rather than plastic.

The downside of thermofoil is its greater susceptibility to heat and moisture damage compared to other materials. Heat-generating appliances such as coffeemakers and toasters should not be placed too close to the cabinets. Heat shields can be placed between cabinets and major appliances such as dishwashers and ranges. Many appliances come with built-in shields.
