= Double margin doors =

Type of door

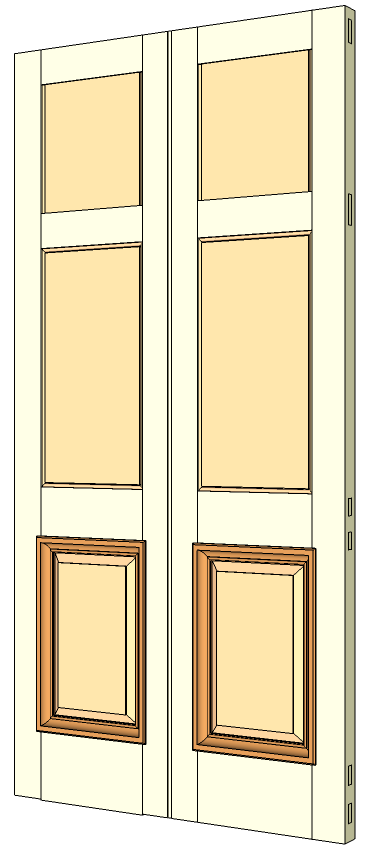
Example of a double margin door.

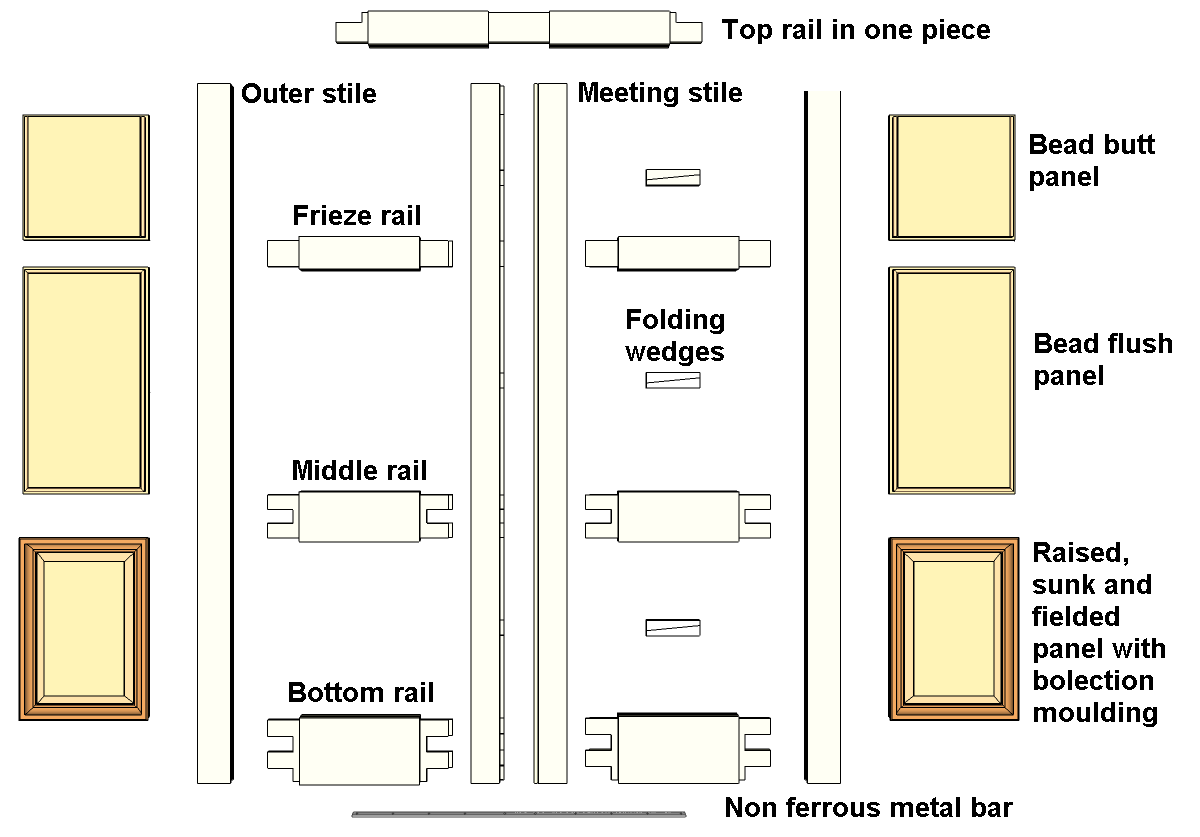
Sample showing the parts of a double margin door.

Double margin door is a pair of narrow doors joined at the meeting stile to make a single door with the appearance of a pair. It is used for door openings that are too wide for a single door but where a pair of doors would be difficult for people to manoeuvre past. An example of a double margin door can be seen at the entrance to 10 Downing Street.

A bench joiner will need to be aware of the correct procedure for assembly of this type of door. Firstly they will glue and wedge the rails to the meeting stiles and then join the two meeting stiles together with the folding wedges, the through top rail and the metal bar recessed into the bottom of the door. Then the panels are slid into their places from the outsides. Of course they will follow good practice when inserting the panels, they will ensure that there is no glue in the groove that will stick the panels to the groove thus allowing the panels to move independently of the rails and stiles so they will not split as the door shrinks or expands. If the door is to be polished they will ensure that the panels are pre-polished with at least one coat to ensure that no bare wood is shown if the panels shrink. Once the panels are inserted the bench joiner will assemble the outer stiles, cramp and ensure the door is square before wedging up the mortise and tenons of the outer stiles.

After cleaning up and sanding the face and back of the door they will fit the bolection moulding and cover moulding in the standard way by screwing through slotted holes in the panels into the bolection moulding and then covering the screw heads with the internal cover moulding which is pinned to the frame of the door and not the panel.

== See also ==
- Frame and panel
