= Cope and stick =

Frame and panel joinery technique

Cope and stick construction is a frame and panel joinery technique often used in the making of doors, wainscoting, and other decorative features for cabinets, furniture, and homes.

In cope and stick construction, the "stick" is the molded edge with a cut along the inside of the frame where it is to be joined to the panel. The panel piece that meets the molding at a right angle must be "coped," or given a cope cut, across the end grain of the wood to match the molding's profile.
