= Frame and panel =

Wood construction in which a panel is enclosed in a rigid frame

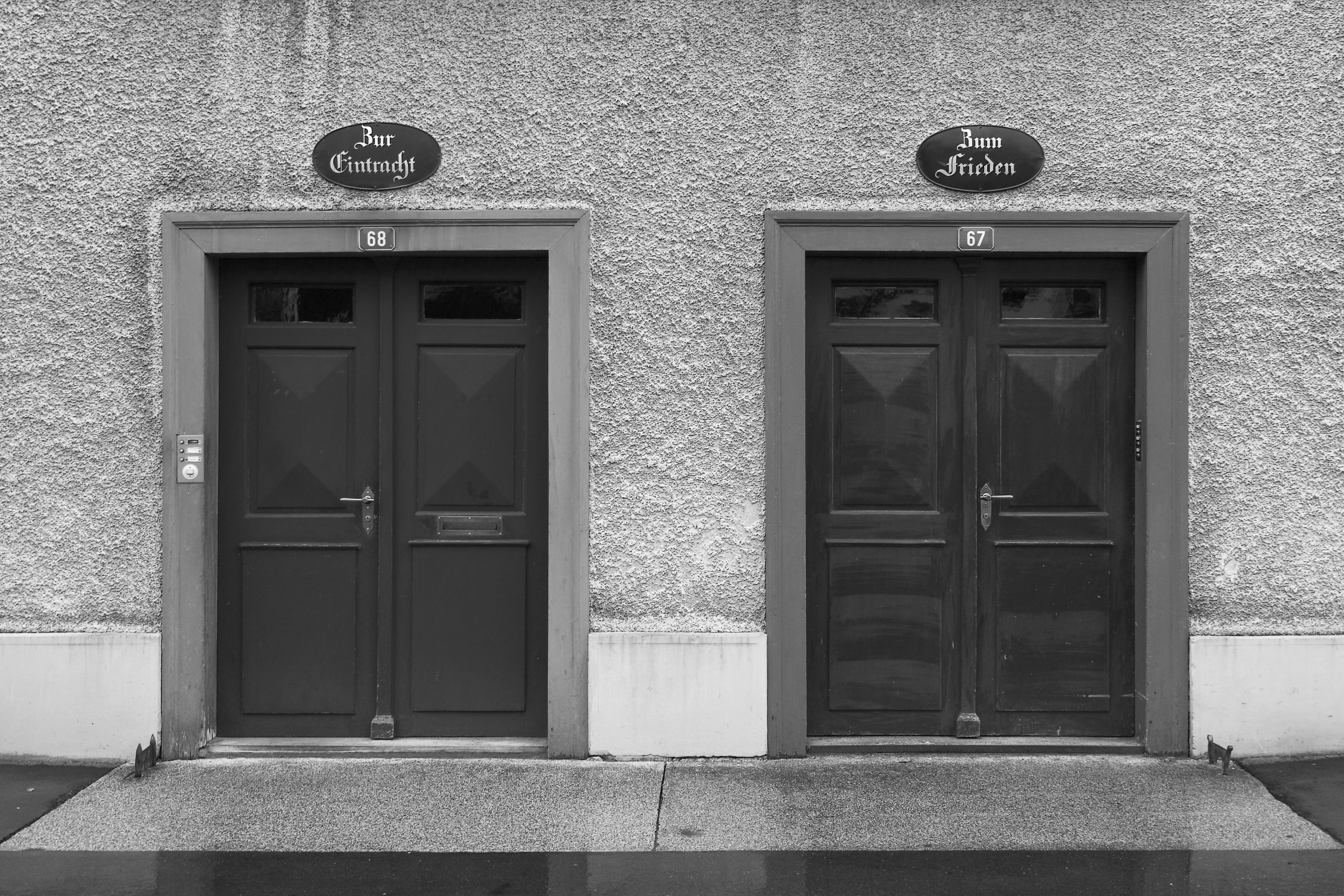
Coffered doors in Bühler, Switzerland

Frame and panel construction, also called rail and stile, is a woodworking technique often used in the making of coffered doors, ceilings, wainscoting, and decorative panels for cabinets, furniture, and home interiors. The basic idea is to capture a 'floating' panel within a frame, as opposed to techniques used in making a slab solid wood cabinet door or drawer front, the door is constructed of several solid wood pieces running in a vertical or horizontal direction with exposed endgrains. Usually, the panel is not glued to the frame but is left to 'float' within it so that seasonal movement of the wood constituting the panel does not distort the frame.

Frame and panel construction at its most basic consists of five members: the panel and the four members which make up the frame. The vertical members of the frame are called stiles while the horizontal members are known as rails. A basic frame and panel item consists of a top rail, a bottom rail, two stiles, and a panel. This is a common method of constructing cabinet doors and these are often referred to as a five piece door.

When a panel will be large it is common to divide it into sections. Pieces known as mid rails and mid stiles or muntins are added to the frame between the panel sections.

== Panels ==
Parts of a five-piece frame and panel door

Panel styles in frame and panel construction

The panel is either captured in a groove made in the inside edge of the frame members or housed in an edge rabbet made in the rear inside edge. Panels are made slightly smaller than the available space within the frame to provide room for movement. Wood will expand and contract across the grain, and a wide panel made of solid wood could change width by half of an inch, warping the door frame. By allowing the wood panel to float, it can expand and contract without damaging the door. A typical panel would be cut to allow 1/4 in (6.4 mm) between itself and the bottom of the groove in the frame. It is common to place some sort of elastic material in the groove between the edge of the panel and the frame before assembly. These items center the panel in the frame and absorb seasonal movement. A popular item for this purpose is a small rubber ball, known as a spaceball (a trademarked product). Some cabinet makers will also use small pieces of cork to allow for movement. The panels are usually either flat or raised.

A flat panel has its visible face flush with the front of the groove in the frame. This gives the panel an inset appearance. This style of panel is commonly made from man-made materials such as MDF or plywood but may also be made from solid wood or tongue and groove planks. Panels made from MDF will be painted to hide their appearance, but panels of hardwood-veneer plywood will be stained and finished to match the solid wood rails and stiles.

A raised panel has a profile cut into its edge so that the panel surface is flush with or proud of the frame. Some popular profiles are the ogee, chamfer, and scoop or cove. Panels may be raised by a number of methods - the two most common in modern cabinetry are by coving on the tablesaw or the use of a panel raising cutter in a wood router or spindle moulder.

== Frame ==
Frames can be constructed by several methods: cope and stick, mortise and tenon, bridle joint, or a simple butt joint. Cope and stick is the most common method, as it is more efficient to manufacture. Mortise and tenon is the strongest, and is often used for large doors which will have greater stresses imposed. Bridle joints are typically used in less formal work, as the exposed endgrain is considered unattractive; while butt joints, being weak, are only used on very small assemblies.

The stiles and rails often have a profile cut into the inside edge of the outside face - usually a smaller version to match the profile of the panel. In some panel styles, a profile may also be cut on the outside edge of the outside face.

In modern cabinetry, the cope and stick joinery is achieved with a set of special router cutters. These cut the profile on the edge of the frame parts and also cut a reverse version of the same profile in the ends of the rail so that they may be slipped over the ends of the stiles and glued in place. If done correctly, the cope cut in the end of the rail will mate perfectly with the sticking profile. When glued together, the resulting joint will have sufficient strength for most cabinet door applications without further reinforcement. For extremely large and heavy doors, the cope and stick joint can be further reinforced with dowels, loose tenons, or by some other method.

For the other methods of frame construction, the inside profile is created either by mitred sticking or by an applied moulding.

In mitred sticking, the profile (known as the sticking) is applied to the edges of both the rail and stile and then a section of the sticking at the ends of each stile is removed leaving a mitred edge which aligns to a similar mitre cut on the ends of the sticking on each rail. This traditional method is more time-consuming to complete, hence the popularity of cope and stick for manufactured items.

When applied moulding is to be used, the moulding is applied to the inside edge of the outer face of the frame after the frame and panel have been assembled.

== Assembly process ==
The process of making raised panel doors begins with gluing up panels, and then moves into cutting and preparing the frame parts. Next, the panels are cut to size and shaped. Parts and panel are sanded before construction. It is also common to apply a finish to panels prior to assembly so that raw wood is not visible if the panel shrinks. The joints are glued and set into clamps. If the frame and panel items are paint grade they are sometimes nailed at the frame joints on the reverse side. The door then moves on to finish sanding where it is brought to its final thickness, and the outside profile is added if required.

== See also ==
- Cabinetry
