= Bedrock (disambiguation) =

Bedrock is a type of rock underlying the Earth's surface.

Bedrock may also refer to:

== Music ==
- Bedrock (duo), a British electronic music duo comprising John Digweed and Nick Muir
- Bedrock Records, a British electronic music record label founded by the above duo

=== Albums ===
- Bedrock (album), a 1999 compilation album by John Digweed
- Bedrock 3, a 2002 compilation album by Chris Fortier
- Bedrock (EP), a 1987 EP by The Foetus All-Nude Revue, or the title song

=== Songs ===
- "BedRock", a 2009 song by hip-hop group Young Money
- "Bedrock", a 1986 song by D.I. from Horse Bites Dog Cries
- "Bedrock", a 1987 song by Giorgio from Sex Appeal

== Films ==
- Bedrock, a 1930 short film directed by Carlyle Blackwell
- Bedrock (2025 film), a documentary film directed by Kinga Michalska

== Technology ==
- Bedrock (framework), a cross-platform project between Apple Computer and Symantec
- Amazon Bedrock, a service from Amazon Web Services for building AI applications
- Bedrock plane, a type of hand plane
- Operation Bedrock, a series of 27 nuclear tests
- Bedrock Linux, a meta Linux distribution

== Gaming ==
- Minecraft: Bedrock Edition, a version of the video game Minecraft used for non-PC devices as well as Windows
- Bedrock, the indestructible block layer that forms the bottom of Minecraft's world

== Other uses ==
- Bedrock (The Flintstones), the name of the fictional town from The Flintstones
- Bedrock, Colorado, an unincorporated town in the United States
- Operation Bedrock (Laos), a military operation of the Laotian Civil War
