= Lie-Nielsen Toolworks =

American toolwork company

Lie-Nielsen Toolworks, Inc. is a family-owned business, established in 1981 and based in Warren, Maine. It manufactures a range of high quality hand tools, primarily for woodworking, based on traditional designs. It is best known for its hand planes. Thomas Lie-Nielsen is the founder and CEO of Lie-Nielsen Toolworks.

== History ==
In the late 1970s, Thomas Lie-Nielsen (pronounced "Lee-Neelsen") worked for Garry Chinn's company, Garrett Wade. In 1981, Garrett Wade's supplier of an adapted Stanley #95 edge trimming block plane, Ken Wisner, was ready to leave the business, so Lie-Nielsen acquired the tooling, plans and components necessary for producing the #95.

Lie-Nielsen relocated from New York to a farm in West Rockport, Maine, where he began production of the plane in a tiny back-yard shed. The first of the new planes was delivered to Chinn in the autumn of 1981.

A few years later, Lie-Nielsen moved into a 384-square-foot (35.7 m^{2}) workshop on the farm, and started production on his second plane, the skew-angle block plane. In 1988, as business grew, Lie-Nielsen bought an 8,000-square-foot (740 m^{2}) building in the town of Warren, Maine, which the company still occupies. In the mid-1990s, Lie-Nielsen moved the entire production to a 13,000-square-foot (1,200 m^{2}) facility.

Today, the Lie-Nielsen Toolworks products compete with mass-produced tools from companies such as Stanley and Record, with sales in the order of 20,000 tools a year. The acquisition of the Independence Tool Co. in 1998 added hand saws to the product line, which has further expanded over the years to include over 50 different models of planes, in addition to spokeshaves, socket chisels, screwdrivers, marking and measuring devices and workbench hardware.

== Construction ==
Lie-Nielsen uses manganese bronze and ductile iron castings, and cryogenically treated A-2 steel.

Manganese bronze, a very hard, strong alloy, is the material of choice for Lie-Nielsen tools because it is heavier than iron, doesn't rust, and won't crack if dropped. Where the use of bronze would result in excessive weight in a tool, ductile iron is used instead.

Lie-Nielsen products are expensive when compared to the mass-produced items from the likes of Stanley and Record, but these higher prices are often defended by comparing them with the prices paid 100 years ago for such tools as Norris infill planes, which could cost up to "a couple of weeks' wages".
