= Secret rebate =

A secret rebate is a kick-back that is made available to some customers or business partners but concealed from others, to the detriment of competition. The practice is usually illegal under state unfair business practice laws.

== California law ==
California offers an example of a law banning secret rebates:

The secret payment or allowance of rebates, refunds, commissions, or unearned discounts, whether in the form of money or otherwise, or secretly extending to certain purchasers special services or privileges not extended to all purchasers purchasing upon like terms and conditions, to the injury of a competitor and where such payment or allowance tends to destroy competition, is unlawful.

— CAL. BPC. CODE § 17045

Cases interpreting California's provision include Eddins v. Redstone, 134 Cal. App. 4th 290 (2005) and Cleveland v. Viacom Inc., 73 F. App’x 736 (5th Cir. 2003).

== See also ==
- Rebate (disambiguation)
- Robinson-Patman Act
