= Grooving plane =

Woodworking tool

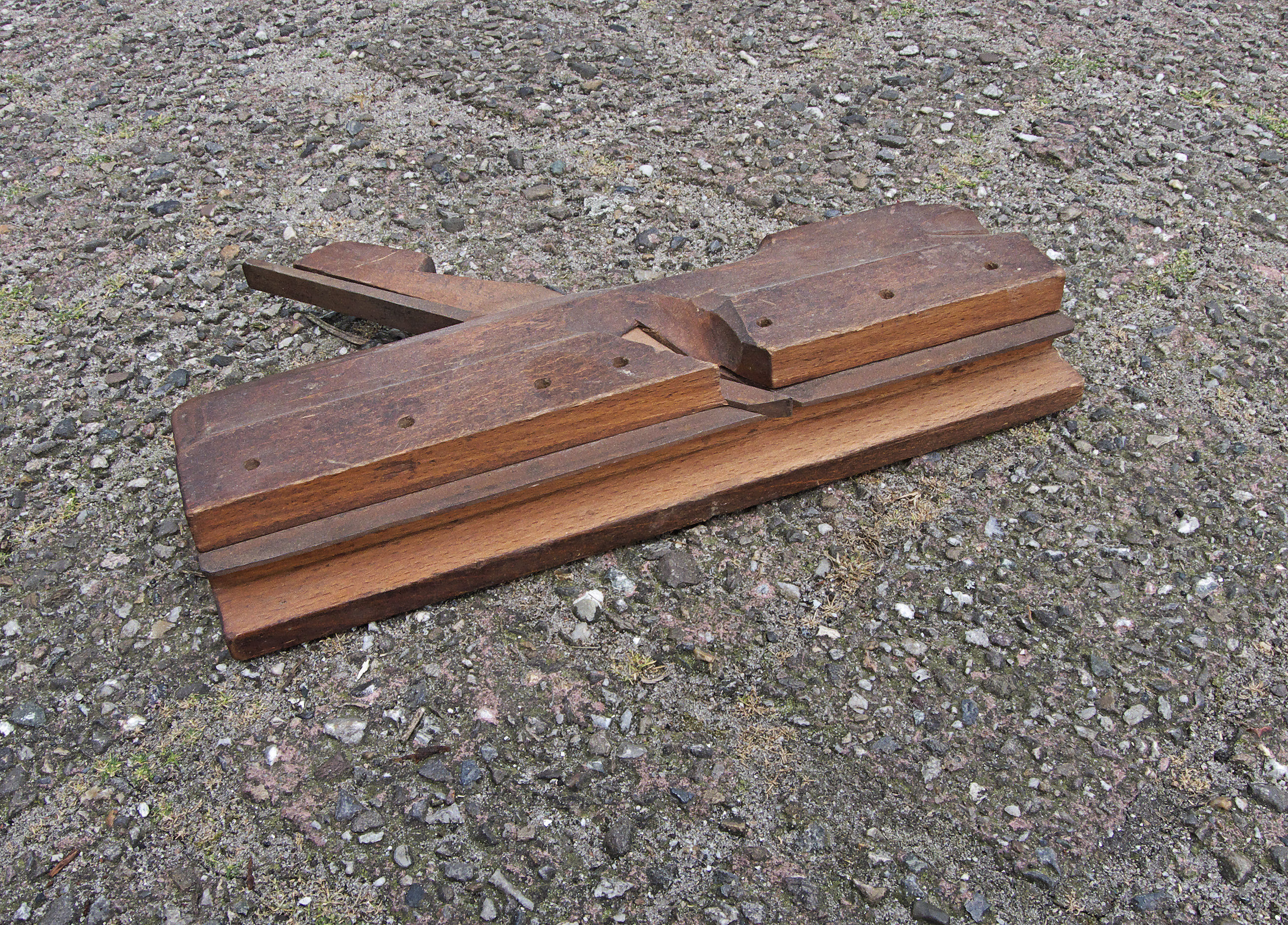
Plane used to make tongues and grooves

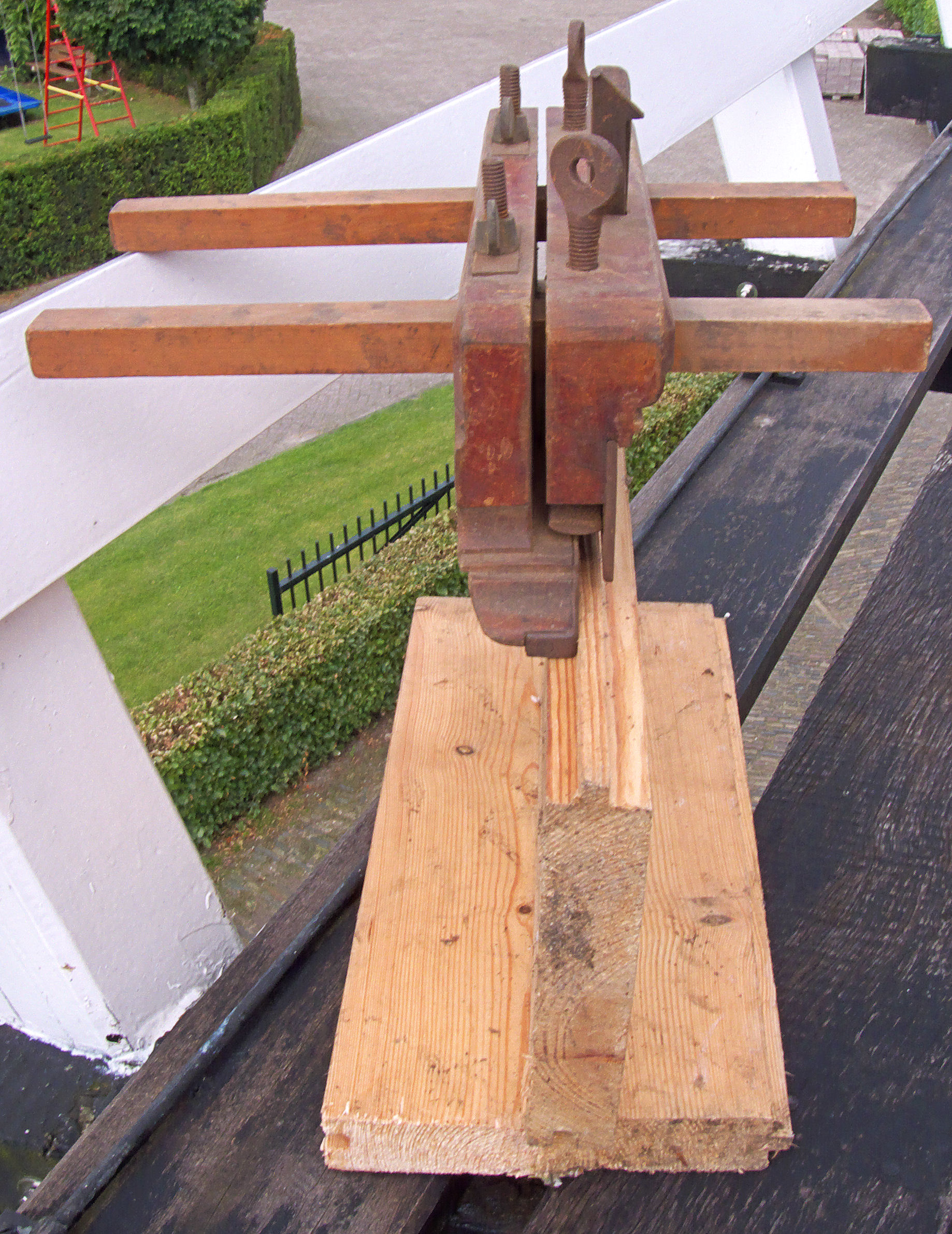
Plane used to make tongues and grooves

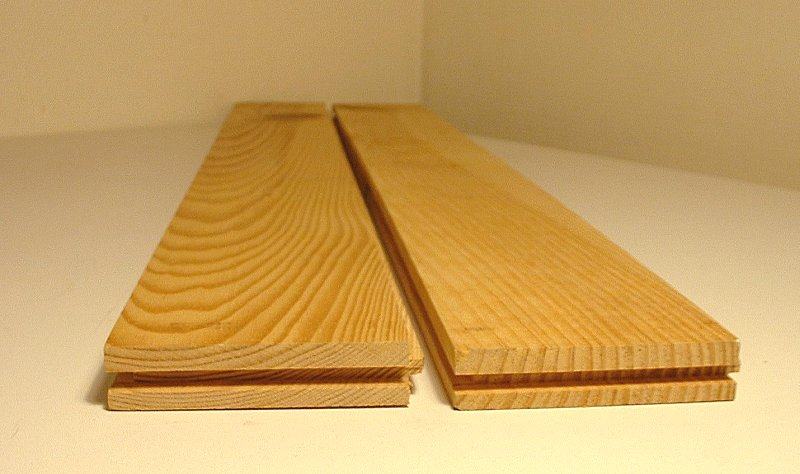
Tongues and grooves

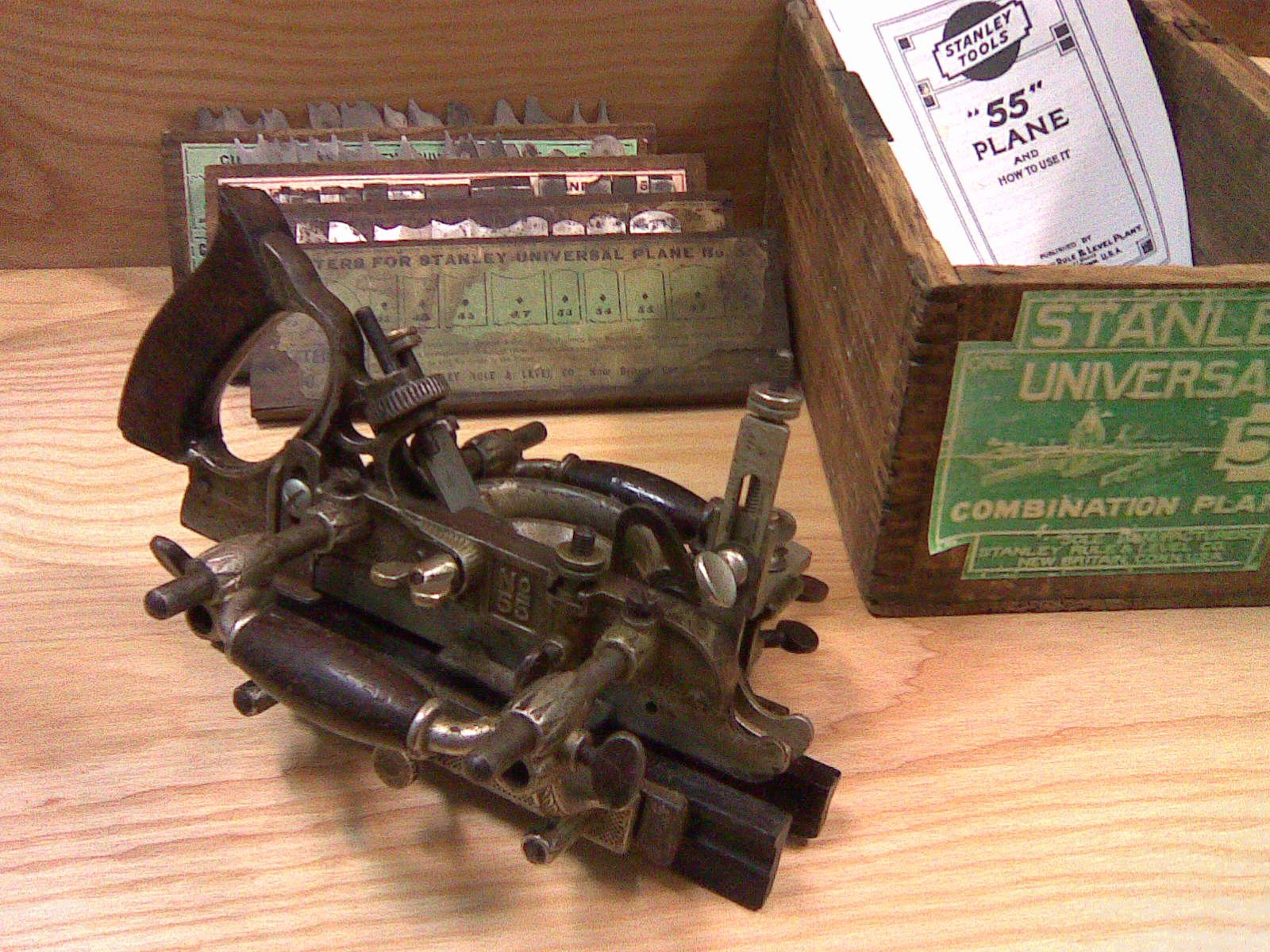
The Stanley 55 combination plane can act as a plow plane.

A grooving plane, plow plane, or plough plane is a plane used in woodworking to make grooves and (with some of the metal versions) small rabbets. They are traditionally used for drawer bottoms or rear walls.
