= Rebate =

Rebate may refer to:

== Sales and finance ==
- Rebate (marketing), a type of sales promotion
  - Conditional rebate
- Tax rebate, a reduction in taxation demanded
- UK rebate, a financial mechanism which reduced the United Kingdom's contribution to the European Union

== Other uses ==
- Rebate or rabbet, a woodworking term for a groove
- Rebate plane, a hand plane designed for cutting rabbets in wood
- Rebate tile, a building material used in southeastern England in the 18th and 19th centuries
- Rebated rim, a firearm cartridge configuration

== See also ==
- Rebate card, a type of debit card
- Kickback (bribery)
