= Indian Mountain Site (Site ID: 5BL876) =

Archeological site in Colorado

The Indian Mountain Site (Site ID: 5BL876) is an archaeological site near Lyons, Colorado.

== Introduction ==
Site 5Bl876 is a multi-component Plains Woodland encampment consisting of several stone rings. Ten stone circles have been found. Thus far, only four rings have been completely excavated. Two rings have been sampled.

=== Importance ===
This site holds the earliest and westernmost known occurrence of Plains pottery in Colorado. This indicates that either some form of contact or intrusion with Woodland people from the east likely occurred.

=== Location ===
The Indian Mountain Site is located along a hogback near Lyons, Colorado. The site is situated in Boulder County, Colorado in a transition zone between the plains and the mountains. This positioning provides the site with vegetation consisting of mostly grass, yucca, and prickly pear cactus.

=== Excavation ===
The Indian Mountain Site was excavated by a group of high school students enrolled in a five-month archaeological field school. The students were participating with the District of Boulder County, CO in an event associated with the 1983 Colorado Archaeological Awareness Year.

When examining the Indian Mountain site, the site was divided into three areas based on spatial separation. Area 1 is the largest, as it contains seven rings. Area 2 contains one ring, which is elevated above the others. Area 3 is in the extreme southeast portion of the site, which consists of two rings.

== Site ==
=== Material culture ===
Circular stone features were found in the site. These stones could have served many different functions, yet the most common function was the use of circular stones to anchor the perimeters of habitation structures. This is a common Colorado feature, particularly in the plains and foothills. Several artifacts were also found throughout the site. In Ring 1, charcoal flecks and two fragmentary deer-sized long bones were uncovered. Also, high concentrations of tiny pebbles were found, which suggest that a living room was located above Ring 1. Ring 3 consisted of a central hearth with rocks and charcoal. Inside Ring 4, two small pottery pieces were uncovered. Reassembled, these pieces formed a single sherd roughly the size of a thumbnail. Most of the artifacts uncovered at the site were found in close proximity to Rings 4 and 5. These included flakes, a projectile point tip, and a snub-nosed scraper with spokeshave/drawknife concavities on both lateral edges. Throughout the entire site, a total of 60 flakes, one fragmentary projectile point, one fragmentary biface, a whole scraper/spokeshave, and a small ceramic sherd were discovered during excavations.

=== Site function ===
According to archaeologists Steve Cassels and Robert Noel Farrington, "Based on the architectural, hearth, and faunal remains, the area undoubtedly served as a campsite." Domestic activities likely occurred at the campsite, as suggested by the presence of the uncovered pottery and end scraper.

== Age ==
=== Pollen analysis dating ===
Pollen analysis was the first method utilized in an attempt to date the stone rings. Pollen samples from Ring 4 and the hearth in Ring 3 were taken for the analysis. The focus of this dating method was to identify subsistence materials and native vegetation that were present when the site was occupied. These samples were compared against an external control sample that was taken from south of Ring 4. Due to the shallow depths of where the pollen samples were collected, the samples had been contaminated with modern pollen. This made the pollen technique unusable. After this dating method failed, two other dating methods were used to find the absolute and relative ages of the stone rings: 1) radiocarbon dating and 2) rain flow.

=== Radiocarbon dating ===
Charcoal flecks from Rings 1, 3, and 4 were processed by an accelerator mass spectrometer at the University of Arizona. Due to the small quantities of charcoal samples available, the standard C-14 dating technique would not been sufficient. For this reason, the accelerator was required. From this process, the lab was able to determine the radiocarbon age. Additionally, through tree-ring calibration, the lab also determined an age range of "real" years.

Ring 1 was dated 1280 ± 195 years B.P. with a calibrated range of A.D. 545 – 910. Ring 3 was dated 1120 ± 195 years B.P. with a calibrated range of A.D. 640 – 1050. Ring 4 was dated 2140 ± 200 years B.P. with a calibrated range of 410 B.C. – A.D. 25. The early date from Ring 4 makes the association with pottery unexpected. To confirm this early date, the stones were tested with a second method.

=== Rain flow dating ===
Archaeologist J. F. Dormaar discovered that rain flow over boulders can change the soil underneath the boulders over time. This occurs by the rainfall lowering the level of the carbonate zone. According to Dormaar, the longer a rock has been in one setting, the lower in the soil it will be. This will affect the "humic coverage index" (HCI). In response to the HCI, effervescence will be caused. With this rain flow technique, examining how long a rock has been placed in a particular setting can be tested. This technique was performed at the Indian Mountain site with mixed results, although similar tests have successfully been performed with stone circles in Wyoming.

While the results did not contradict those found with the radiocarbon dating, the results were not as supportive as they could have been. Supporting the radiocarbon date were tests performed on Ring 4. Ring 4 received the earliest radiocarbon date, and also demonstrated the greatest depth to effervescence. Results from testing in Area 1, Rings 1 and 3, were not as supportive. In this region, six rocks were sampled, with some rocks reaching depths greater than 30 cm. The problem with this result was that no effervescence was observed from five out of the six rocks tested. The one rock that did have effervescence present was located at a depth of 11 cm. Dormaar examined the site and proposed that the odd results could be explained by topographic and seasonal influences. He thinks that the flat structure of Area 3 makes the region function as a recharge area, while the slope of Area 1 functions as a discharge area. These geographic layouts, combined with seasonal affects, could cause the movement of carbonates, which would in return deplete the soil carbonate pool.

== Conclusions ==
Although stone circle sites are common along the Plains, the Indian Mountain site is not as ordinary as it may first seem. The finding of the early dated pottery sherd is surprising. Currently, it is thought that a western diffusion of Woodland traits entered into Colorado over many generations. Influences would have spread from Kansas to Nebraska, and eventually to Colorado. There is not a high amount of Plains Woodland culture in Colorado prior to A.D. 500, which makes the pottery find at the site very interesting. It is presumed that contact with a Woodland group from the east likely occurred, either directly or through other groups. This could have occurred directly from a migrating band, or a hunting or trading party. Or the clay vessel was possibly traded west through many different groups before reaching the Indian Mountain site. Or maybe, an eastern potter taught the Colorado locals how to craft such a piece. Currently, these are all speculations. The unknown nature of how the pottery entered the site is what makes the Indian Mountain site fascinating.

== See also ==
List of Prehistoric Sites in Colorado
