= Spill plane =

A spill plane is a device which creates long, spiraling wood shavings or tapers which are used to move fire from one place to another. They were most common in the era before matches were common. They are unique in that ordinarily wood planes are used to shape a piece of wood, whereas with a spill plane the shaving is the product.
