= Finger plane =

Woodworking tool

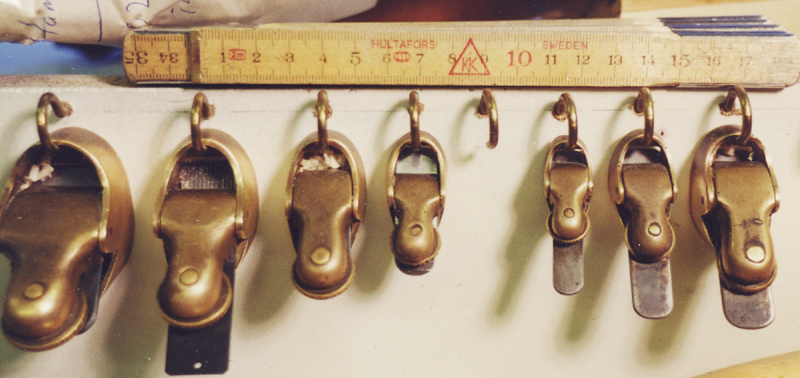
Finger planes from a violin builder's workshop

A finger plane is a small plane, typically with a brass body, used by luthiers (violin and guitar makers). Mameganna, or its literal translation, bean plane, may be used, especially for Japanese-style planes.

Finger planes are used for final trimming work after glue-up, particularly around curved edges and to level inlays across curved instrument tops. They are thus small in length, as they do not need to span a wide area as a jointer plane does. They are also narrow in blade width, as they are meant for trimming the edges of thin boards, or for scrubbing small areas when graduating the thickness of arched soundboards. Some have flat bases, for convex work; the more distinctive have curved bases for concave surfaces. They are made with soles in a range of curvatures and a typical workshop will have several, of varying curvature.

As the planes are only used for a narrow task, they are not adjustable and they are made with fixed mouths and a blade that is clamped in place by a simple wedge, or by a clamp screw, not an adjuster. To add mass to such a small plane, they are commonly cast in a dense brass or bronze alloy. Luthiers making their own planes typically make them from offcuts of dense tropical hardwoods. Wood-bodied, wedged-blade planes can be made fairly quickly, using a strong, seasoned wood for the body and either a blade for another plane or one reshaped from a chisel blade.

Ibex is a common manufacturer of bronze finger-planes; they vary in quality, and some may need to be re-shaped to avoid clogging in use.

== Gallery ==
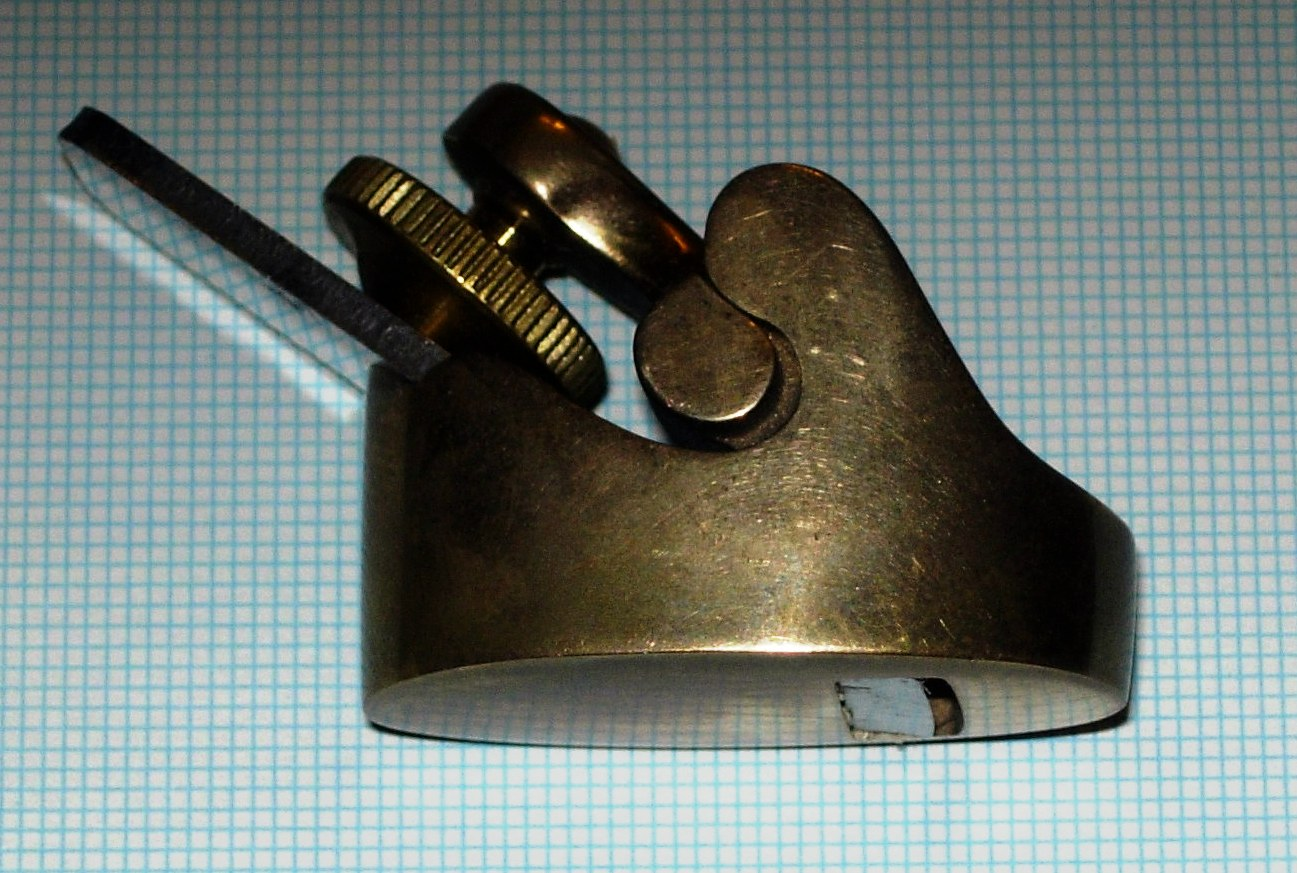
Ibex finger plane, 35 mm length, with curved sole

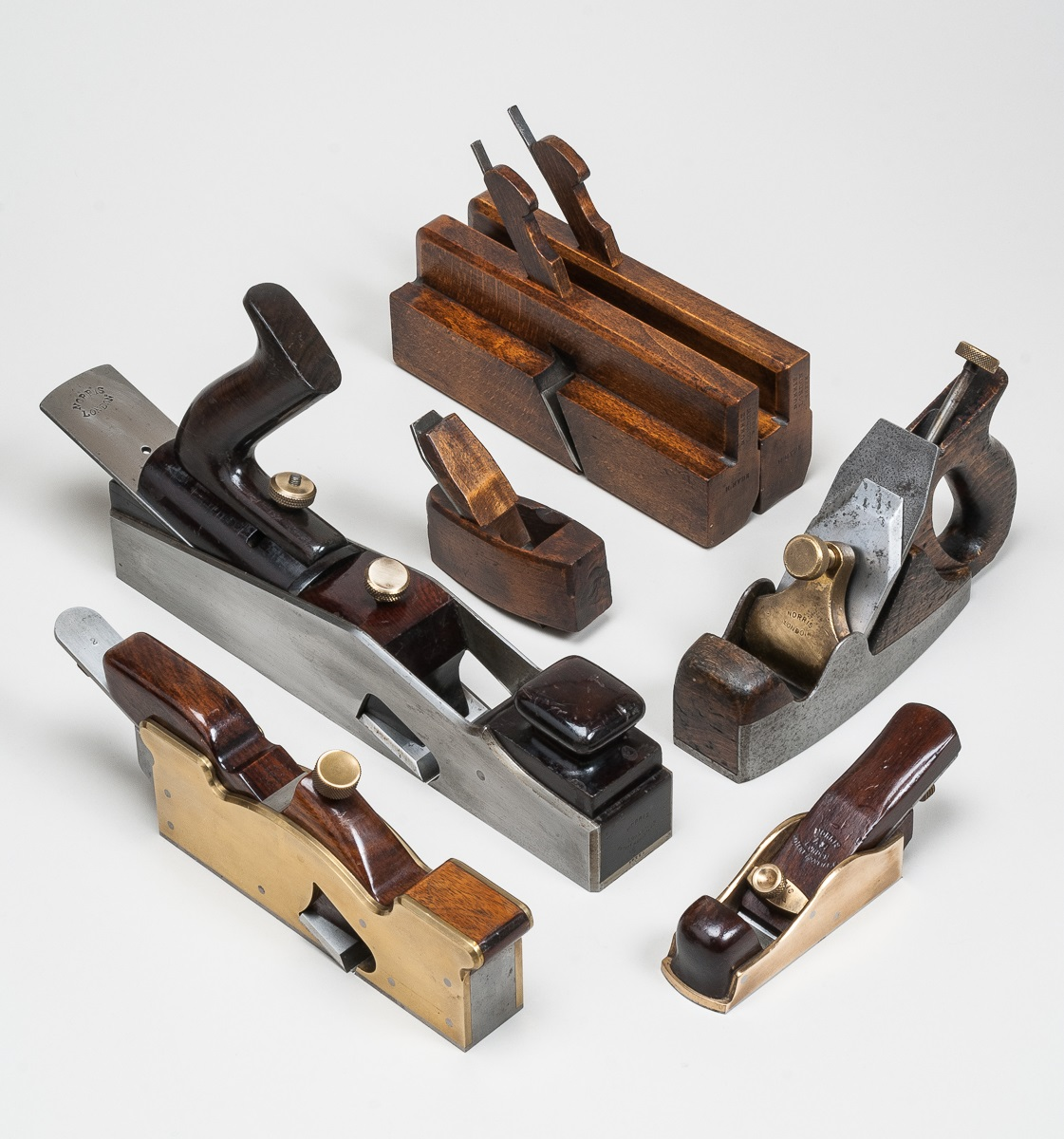
Norris and Henley planes, wood and metal bodies

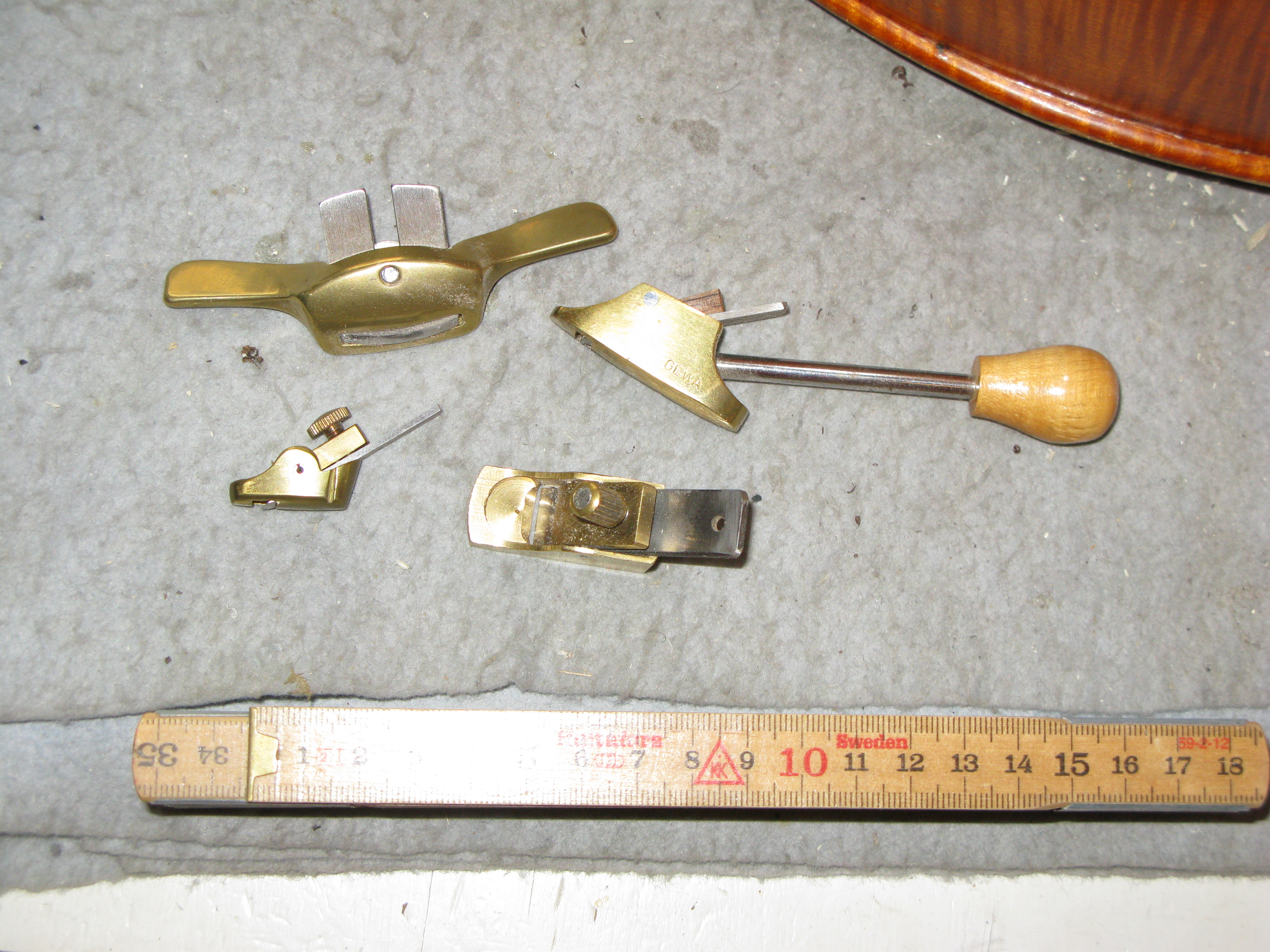
Violin-maker's planes

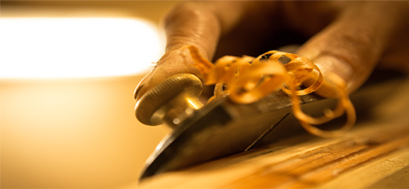
In use
