= Router plane =

Woodworking hand tool

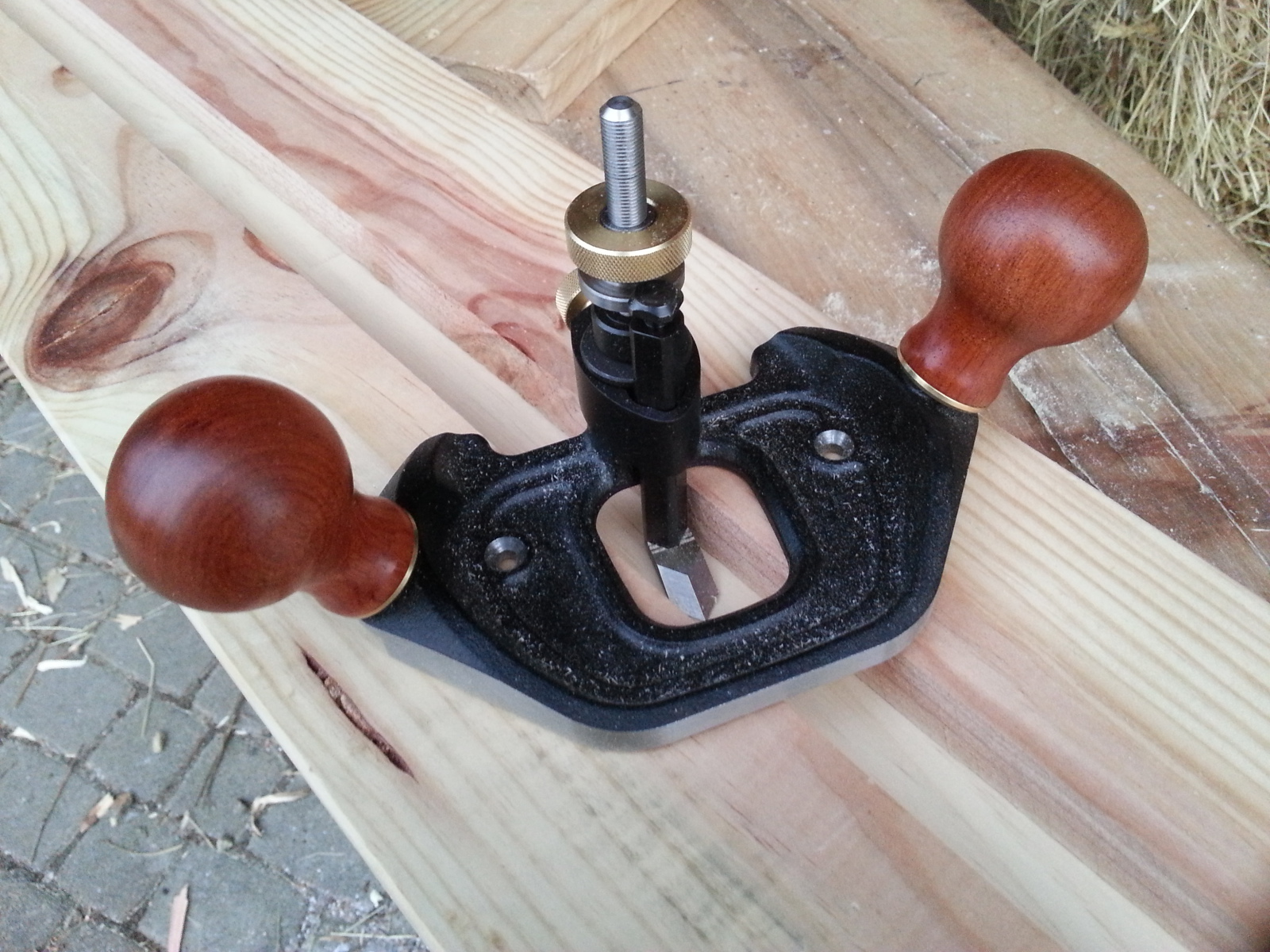
- Router plane being used to plane a groove
- Other names: Old woman's tooth; Depthing router; Granny's tooth
- Classification: Woodworking hand plane

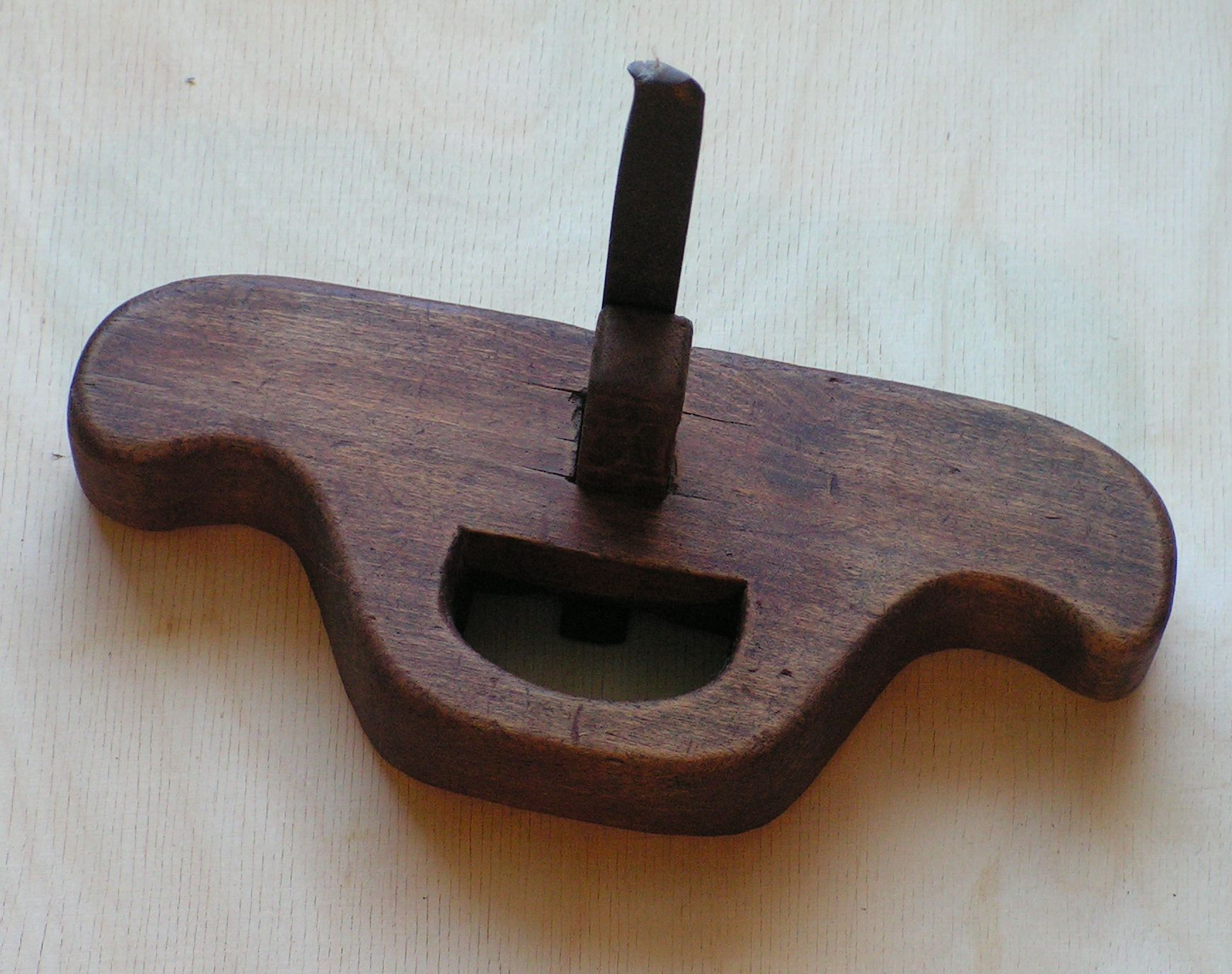
A wooden router plane

A router plane is a hand plane tool used in the field of woodworking for smoothing out sunken panels, and more generally for all depressions below the general surface of the lumber. It planes the bottoms of recesses to a uniform depth and can work into corners that otherwise can only be reached with a chisel. The tool is used by hand tool woodworkers. Power tool woodworkers often use the electrical router for similar work.

This replacement occurred in 1906 with the invention of the first portable power router which was patented by George Kelley and marketed by the Kelley Electric Machine Company.These early electrical routers were heavier than the ones today.

One of the first times a router plane shows up in recorded history is in the book Knight's American Mechanical Dictionary according to google n-gram. This book was written by Edward Henry Knight, a mechanical expert in the 1800s.
