= Cesar Chelor =

African-American woodworker (c. 1720–1784)

Cesar Chelor (born in Wrentham, Massachusetts) was an African-American woodworker, toolmaker, plane-maker and was enslaved by the colonial entrepreneur and the earliest documented American plane maker Francis Nicholson (1683–1753). Chelor is the earliest documented African-American plane maker in North America.

== Background ==
Chelor's exact birthdate is unknown; however, he is thought to have been born in about 1720. He was owned by Nicholson as early as 1736. In 1741, Chelor was admitted to the Congregational Church in Wrentham Center when he was supposedly 21. Chelor would become a freeman when Nicholson died in 1753. Along with freedom, Nicholson willed Chelor a workshop, 10 acres of land, tools and materials to continue independently.

Chelor was married to Juda Russell in 1758, with whom he had shared eight (Note: According to some sources, he had nine children, six of whom he buried himself before he died in 1784.) children.

In 1784, Chelor died without a will with an estate inventory valued at 77 pounds 2 shillings.
