= Bedrock plane =

Type of hand tool for woodworking

Bedrock is a design of bench planes developed by Stanley Works as an attempt to improve over the Bailey plane design. It was introduced in the early 20th century.

The main difference of the Bedrock design was in the frog, the angled bed of the plane which holds the cutting blade. The blade (also known as an iron) is held by the frog in a bevel-down position. A characteristic of the Bailey design is that the frog is secured to the upper side of the sole, and the iron extends unsupported through a slot machined in the sole of the plane. Some claim that this contributes to what is commonly referred to as "blade chatter", which is an uneven surface created in the wood. However, nobody to date has been able to replicate this phenomenon intentionally or show that this has anything to do with the way the frog is anchored to the main body of the plane. More likely, it is due to an inexperienced grip on the plane or the work piece not being secured enough, causing it to vibrate.The Bedrock design was made to more precise standards but both frog types can be anchored tight enough to avoid any movement. The Bedrock frog extends through a much larger slot milled in the sole of the plane, providing support to the iron almost to its cutting edge. This combined with a better mounting of the frog to the plane body provides a more solid bedding of the iron to the plane body, hence the name bedrock, yet this has not led to a discernible improvement in performance.

In addition to iron support, another element widely perceived as problematic with the Bailey design is that the frog mounting screws are under the cutting iron, so the cutting iron assembly must be removed if one wishes to adjust the position of the frog. This adjustment is made to vary the opening at the "mouth", which refers to the position of the cutting edge in relation to the front of the slot in the sole, and which is supposedly used to control the size of shaving taken by the plane. However, the fact that no vintage planes are ever found with a closed throat indicates that craftsmen of old made use of this feature on only extremely rare occasions. The Bedrock design incorporated a new adjustment method in which the entire frog could be wound forward or back, if necessary, thus adjusting the mouth, without removing the blade.

However, a clear problem with the Bedrocks which nobody seems to address is that the surface between the frog and the sole is not parallel, like on Bailey planes, but at an incline. This means that any adjustment made to open or close the throat also alters the depth of cut, which must be reset before continuing any work.

A similarity between Bedrocks and Baileys is that they both featured thin irons, which are evidently easier to sharpen, since there is less steel to remove. Indeed, on most Stanley irons the functional surface is laminated with hard, wear resistant steel and mild steel in the remainder of the iron. Modern irons from other makers are much thicker, which means more material to remove, and are 100 percent tool steel, hardened to about Rockwell 62. Of course, these are priced at multiple times more than basic Bailey pattern plane irons which were the preferred option for most craftsmen until the crafts began to disappear.

Since the cheaper Baileys were kept in production along with the Bedrocks, to make the distinction easier, square designs were modelled in the body of the bedrock planes.

Long discontinued, Bedrocks are still sought after mainly by tool collectors but also hobby woodworkers. Although no benefits have been identified, some users prefer to retro-fit thicker irons, which are available to suit most plane types but may require modifications to support the greater thickness behind the cap iron.
