= Rebate plane =

Hand plane designed for cutting rabbets in wood

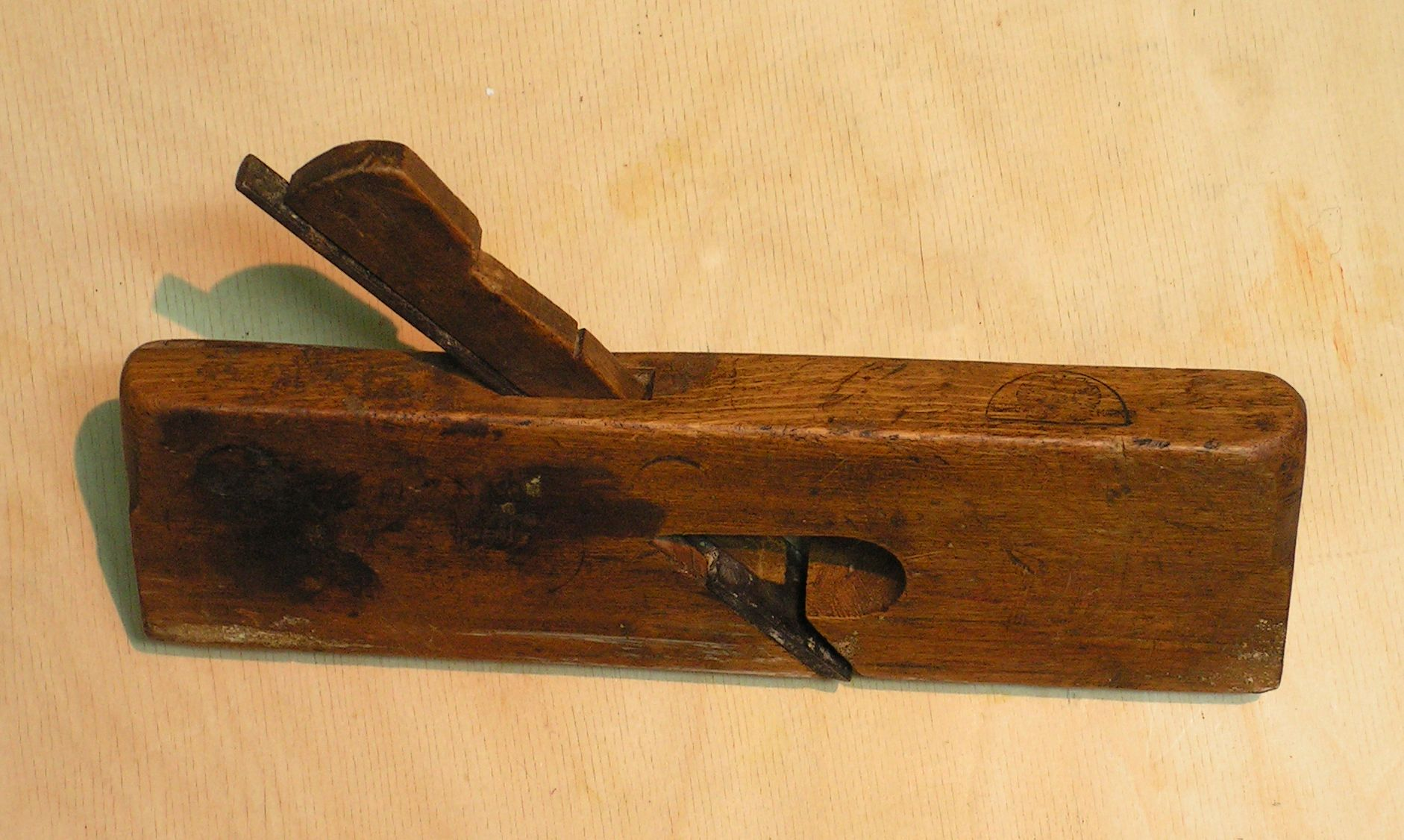
A wood rabbet plane

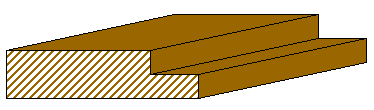
A rabbet or rebate

The rebate plane (British English) or rabbet plane (American English) is a hand plane designed for cutting rebates/rabbets in wood. It is a hand tool used in many Western countries with hundreds of years of history. It was in use in England at least as early as the 11th century.

== Description ==
The rebate plane is one of a group of planes, including the shoulder plane, bullnose plane, and carriage makers plane, in which the blade protrudes by a very small amount—usually less than half a millimetre—from the sides of the plane body on both sides. It is a hand plane designed for cutting rebates/rabbets in wood. The blade is slightly wider than the body of the plane. The reason for the slight protrusion of the blade is so that the plane body does not bind on the side of the cut, which would result in the side wall of the rabbet not being perpendicular to the bottom.

The rebate plane commonly has a depth stop and a fence, which allows the width and depth of the rabbet to be gauged. They also are commonly equipped with a spur, which is designed to score the wood as the rabbet is cut, giving a cleaner corner. This is particularly valuable when working across the grain.

== Use ==
Rebate planes are intended for long grain cutting and are generally set up to remove large amounts of material quickly. The mouth is set quite coarsely to allow large chips to be removed.

== Variations ==
There are a few variations of this plane, including the duplex rebate plane, which has two locations for the blade: one in the middle of the body for normal cutting and one at the front to allow cutting into corners. In the latter mode, the duplex rebate plane is similar to a bullnose plane.
