= Leonard Bailey (inventor) =

American inventor (1825–1905)

- Born: May 8, 1825; Hollis, New Hampshire, United States
- Died: February 5, 1905 (aged 79); New York City
- Occupation: Toolmaker/cabinet Maker

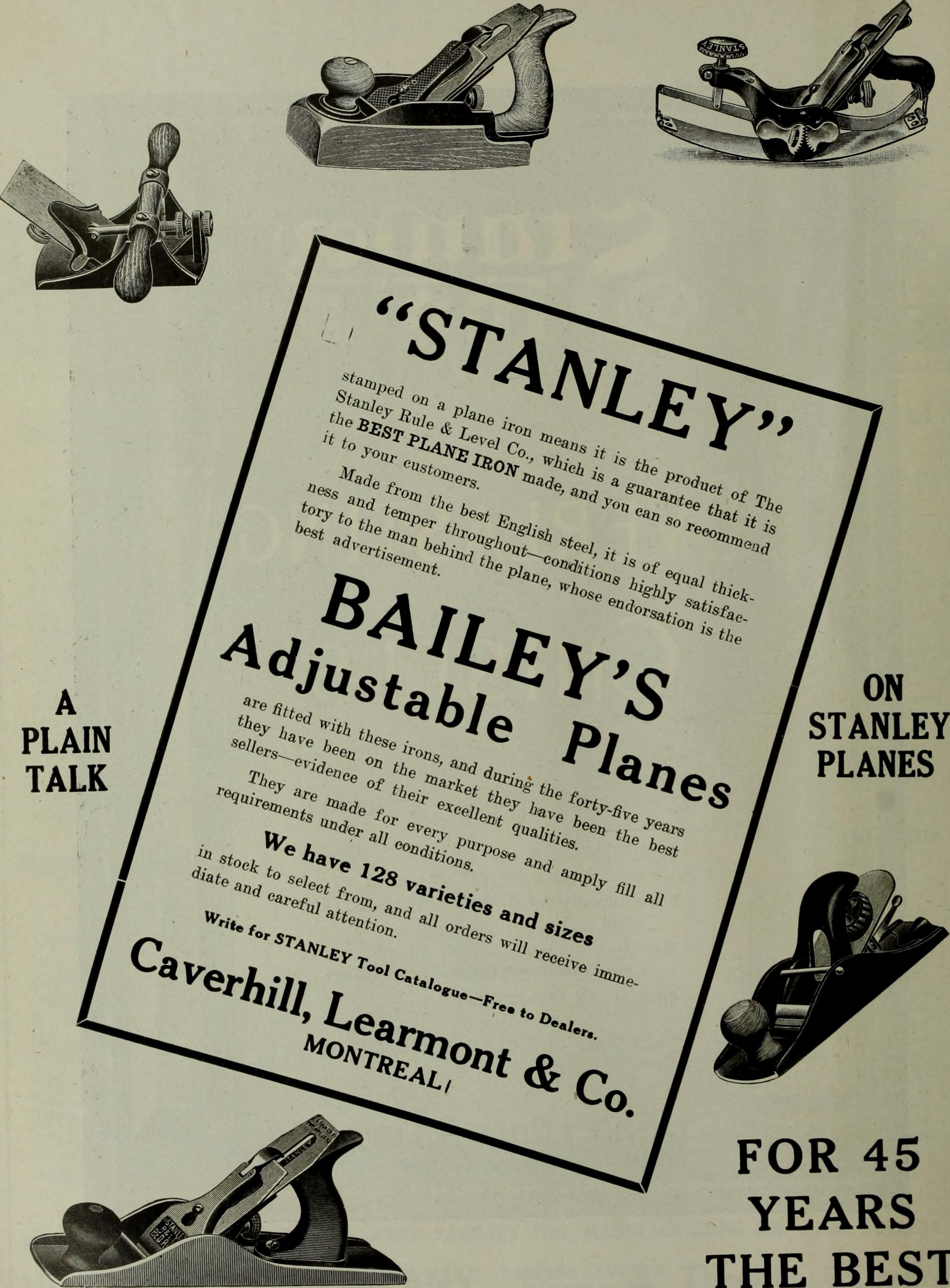
Stanley advertising, showing Bailey's plane designs

Leonard Bailey (May 8, 1825 in Hollis, New Hampshire – February 5, 1905 in New York City) was a toolmaker and cabinet maker from Massachusetts, United States, who in the mid-to-late nineteenth century patented several features of woodworking equipment. Most prominent of those patents were the planes manufactured by the Stanley Rule & Level Co. (now Stanley Black & Decker) of New Britain, Connecticut.

These planes, commonly known as Stanley Bailey planes, were prized by woodworkers of the late-nineteenth and early-twentieth centuries, and remain popular among today's wood craftspeople. A type study of his patented planes and the rest of the Stanley line may be found at Patrick Leach's "Blood and Gore".

Bailey's design ideas are still used by Stanley and other plane manufacturers to this day.
