= Block plane =

Small metal-bodied woodworking hand plane

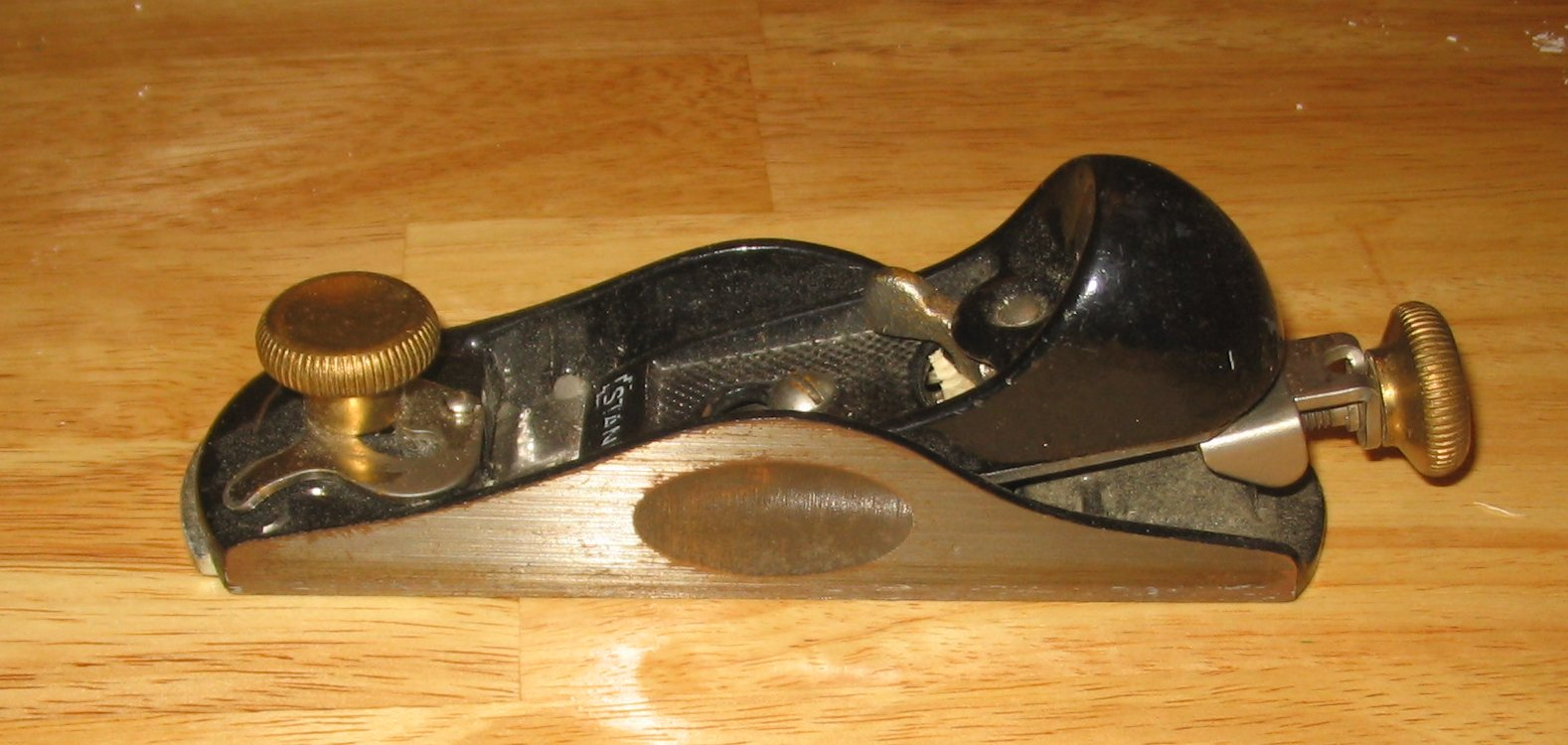
- Stanley No. 60½ low angle block plane
- Classification: Woodworking hand plane
- Types: Standard angle; Low angle; Duplex; Rabbet; Pocket sized

A block plane is a small metal-bodied woodworking hand plane which typically has the blade bedded at a lower angle than other planes, with the bevel up. It is designed to cut end grain and do touchup or finish work. It is typically small enough to be used with one hand.

== Description ==
Block planes vary in length from 3 to 7 inches (76 to 178 mm). The most common standard angled block planes have the blade angled at ~20°. Low angle block planes have the blade angled at ~12°.

== Origin ==
According to Patrick's Stanley Blood and Gore, Stanley marketing materials describe the origin of the name of this tool as follows: "A Block Plane was first made to meet the demand for a Plane which could be easily held in one hand while planing across the grain, particularly the ends of boards, etc. This latter work many Carpenters call 'Blocking in', hence the name 'Block' Plane." Tradition also claims that the block plane gets its name from its traditional use to level and remove cleaver marks from butchers' blocks that were built with the end grain facing up.

It is a common modern error to refer to older wooden-bodied bench planes as block planes, as they were made from a block of wood. Historically, the term “block plane” was not used before it was applied to small metal-bodied planes, which were designed and produced beginning in the 1860s.

== Usage ==
A block plane is frequently used for paring end grain. This is possible because a block plane has its blade set at a shallow bed angle, allowing the blade to slice through end grain more efficiently. The iron is frequently held by the frog at an angle sometimes as much as 45 degrees to the direction of travel, so that the cutting edge slices the wood fibers as they pass from one end of the cutting edge to the other.

A block plane has many other uses in woodworking. Typically, it is used for cleaning up components by removing thin shavings of wood in order to make a component fit within fine tolerances. Chamfering (angling square edges) and removing glue lines are some of the other uses woodworkers find for the block plane.

== See also ==
- Dado plane
- Surform
