= Shoulder plane =

Woodworking tool

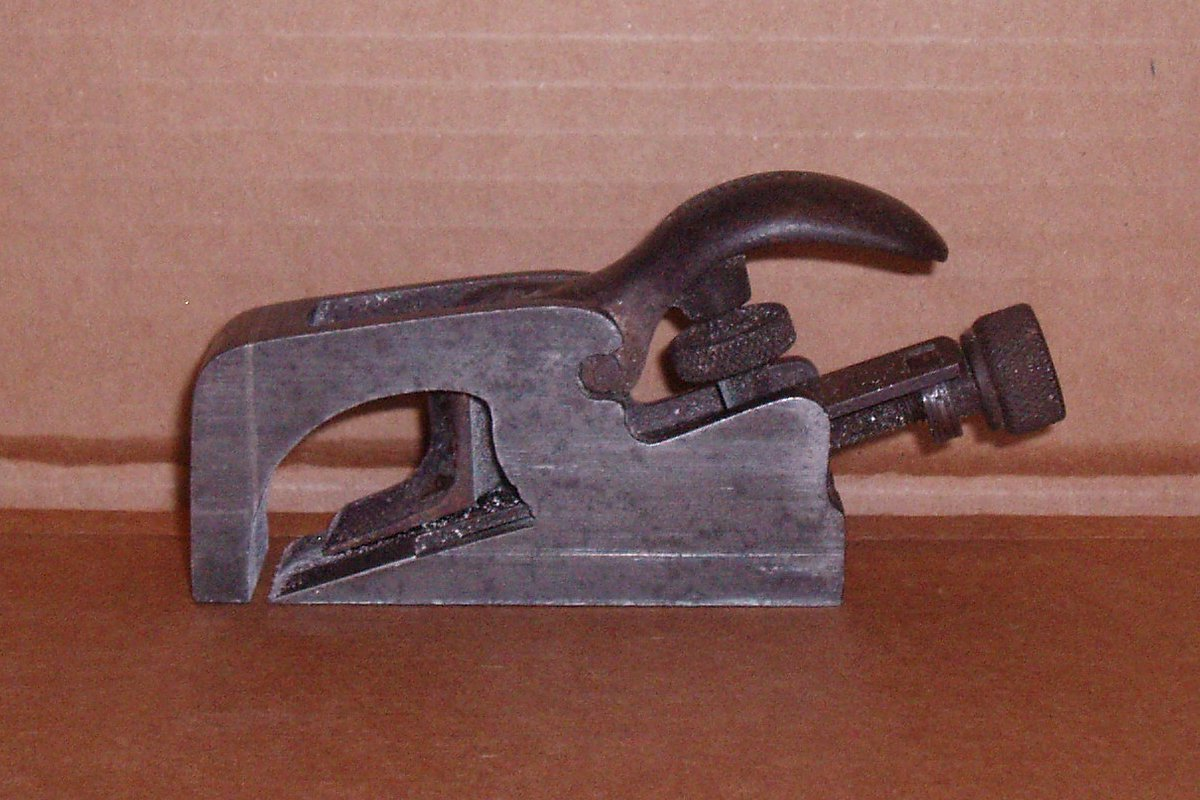
A bullnose shoulder plane. In this model the mouth is adjusted by adding or removing shims behind the removable nose.

The shoulder plane (also bullnose plane) is a plane tool with a blade flush with the edges of the plane, allowing trimming right up to the edge of a workpiece. Like a rebate plane, the shoulder plane's blade extends, therefore cuts, to the full width of the tool. The shoulder plane can be used to trim the shoulders and faces of tenons. It is used when it is necessary to trim right into the concave corner where two surfaces of the same piece of wood meet perpendicularly. It is also commonly used to clean up dadoes (housings) and tenons for joinery.

Unlike the rebate plane, the shoulder plane is intended to cut end grain. There are therefore differences between it and a rebate plane in the angles at which the iron (blade) is set.

- There is a more acute angle between the iron and the sole of the tool.
- The iron is set square across the tool rather than obliquely (skewed).
- The iron is set face down. The ground and honed bevel forming the edge is uppermost.

A shoulder plane also has a much finer set mouth, which allows finer shavings to be taken.
