= Bedrock Linux =

Linux meta-distribution for mixing distributions

Bedrock Linux is a meta Linux distribution with a modular design philosophy which enables the user to integrate chosen features of otherwise disparate distros. Bedrock Linux's development began 2009-06-06; its latest version 0.7.31 was released 2026-01-12, with the 0.7 series being named Poki (as with all major releases the name being taken from either Avatar: The Last Air Bender or the Legend of Korra franchise). It has been well received in the distro-hopping community.
