= Rabbet =

Cut recess or groove, often in wood

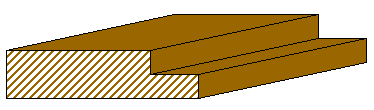
A rabbet

A rabbet (American English) or rebate (British English) is a recess or groove cut into the edge of a piece of machinable material, usually wood. When viewed in cross-section, a rabbet is two-sided and open to the edge or end of the surface into which it is cut.

An example of the use of a rabbet is in a glazing bar where it makes provision for the insertion of the pane of glass and putty. It may also accommodate the edge of the back panel of a cabinet . It is also used in door and casement window jambs, and for shiplap planking. In a picture frame the rabbet may hide uneven or poor edges of a painting and its support, while for graphic art and photographs protective glazing is used. A rabbet can be used to form a joint with another piece of wood (often containing a dado).

Rabbet joints are easy to construct, but are not as strong as some other joints. Nails and screws can be added to help increase the overall strength.

== Etymology ==
The word rabbet is from Old French rabbat, "a recess into a wall", and rabattre "to beat down". According to the Oxford English Dictionary, "In North America the more usual form is rabbet". The form "rebate" is often pronounced the same way as "rabbet".

== Methods ==
- A rabbet router using a straight or rebate bit
- Rabbetting or rebate plane or a shoulder plane
- Circular saw with multiple passes (depending on width and depth)
- Dado set in a single pass
- Spindle moulder
- Hand saw and chisel
- Jointer equipped with a rabbet ledge

== See also ==
- Bevel
- Chamfer
- Dado
