= Spokeshave =

Woodworking hand tool

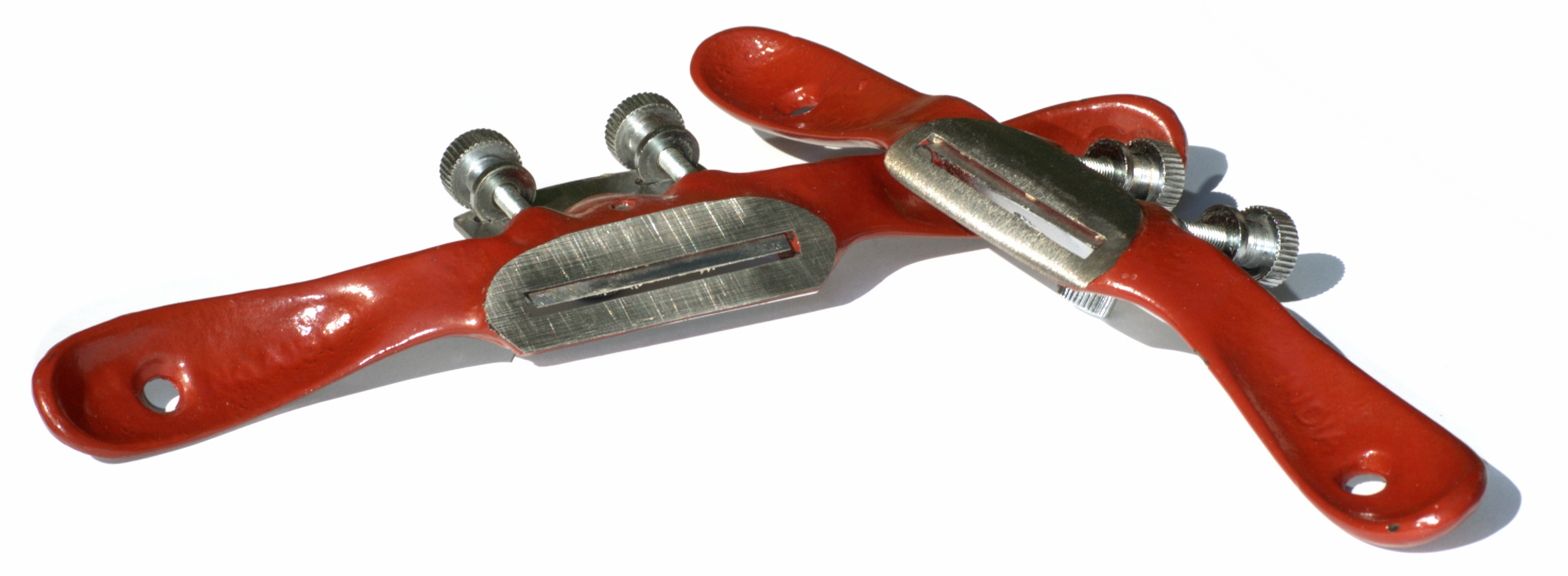
- Metal-handled spokeshaves, one with a flat sole and one with a rounded sole

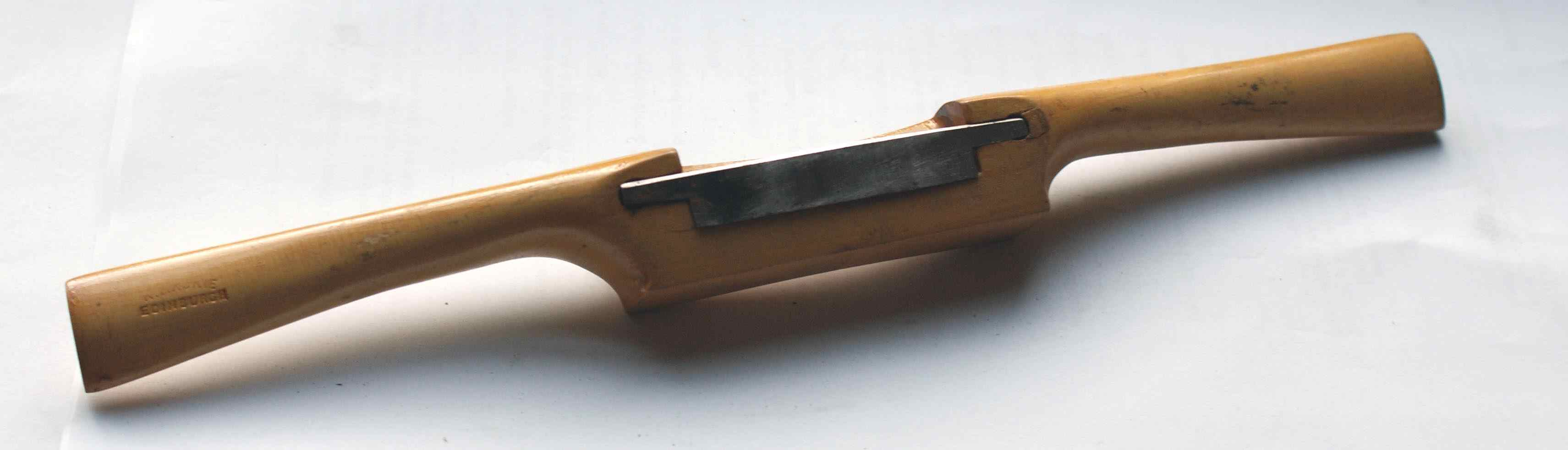
- Wooden spokeshave
- Classification: Woodworking hand tool
- Types: Flat; Rounded bottom; Concave; Convex; Combination

A spokeshave is a hand tool used to shape and smooth woods in woodworking jobs such as making cart wheel spokes, chair legs, paddles, bows, and arrows. The tool consists of a blade fixed into the body of the tool, which has a handle for each hand. Historically, a spokeshave was made with a wooden body and metal cutting blade. With industrialization metal bodies displaced wood in mass-produced tools. Being a small tool, a spokeshave is not suited to working large surfaces.

== History ==
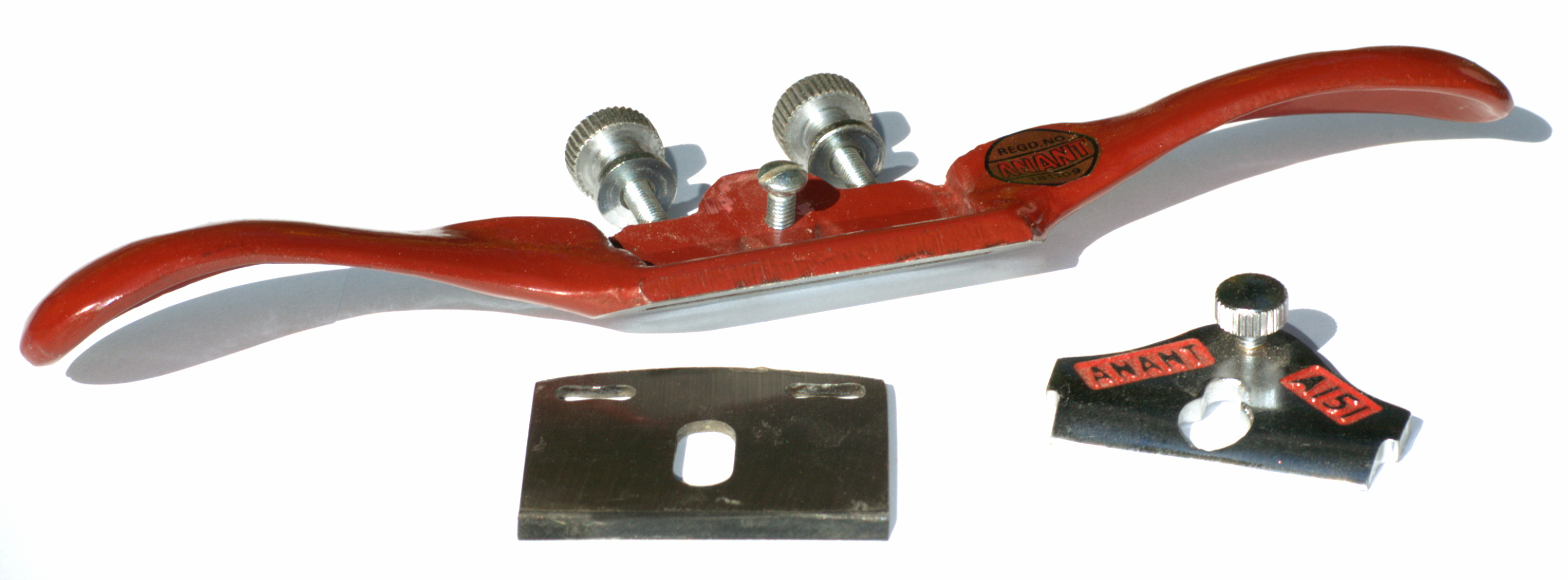
Spokeshave components

The name spokeshave dates back to at least the 16th century, though the early history of the tool is not well documented. The name spokeshave reflects the early use of the tool by wheelwrights.

The first spokeshaves were made of wood – usually beech – with steel blades, before being largely superseded by the development of metal-bodied spokeshaves in the latter half of the 19th century, though many woodworkers still use wooden spokeshaves. Due to their widespread use and versatility vintage wooden spokeshaves remain commonly available and affordable.

== Types ==
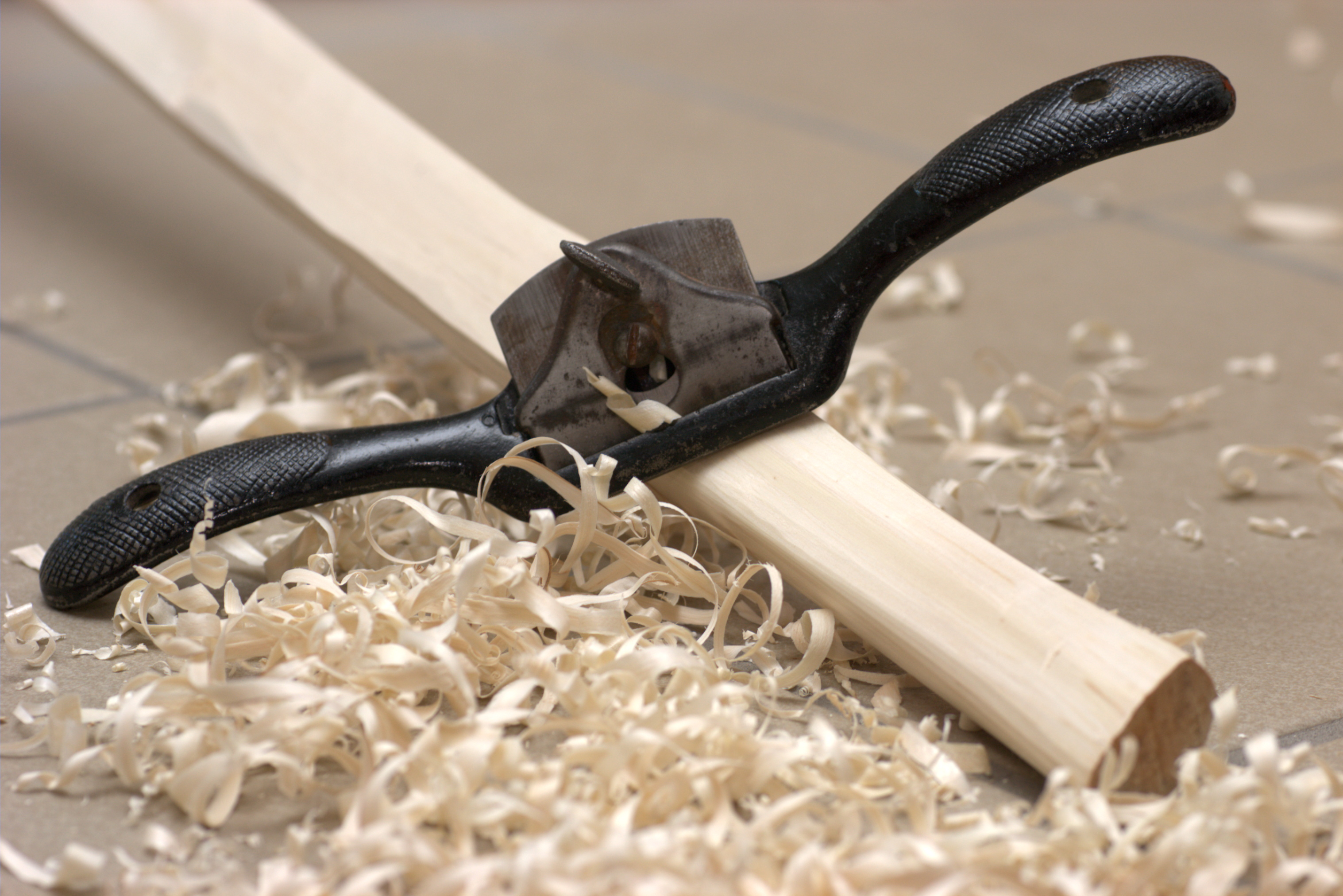
Rounding square wooden stock

Spokeshaves consist of a blade or iron secured to the body or stock of the tool, which has two handles – one for each hand. The bottom surface of the tool is called the sole. The blade can be removed for sharpening, and adjusted to vary the depth of the cut.

An early design consisted of a metal blade with a pair of tangs to which the wooden handles were attached, as with a drawknife. Unlike a drawknife, but like a plane, spokeshaves typically have a sole plate that fixes the angle of the blade relative to the surface being worked.

There are a wide variety of different types of spokeshave, suited to different trades and applications. However, based on the shape of the sole and blade spokeshaves can be categorised into the following:

- Flat bottom – Used for flat and concaved surfaces and curves
- Concave – For use on convexed surfaces and curves
- Convex – For use on concaved surfaces and curves
- Rounded bottom – For use on concaved surfaces, especially on tight curves
- Combination – One edge of the blade is convexed, the opposite edge concaved, so the tool can be used on concaved and convexed surfaces.

Spokeshaves can include one or more sharpened notches along which the wooden shaft is pulled in order to shave it down to the proper diameter.

Some convex, wooden variants of the spokeshave are called travishers.

== Uses ==
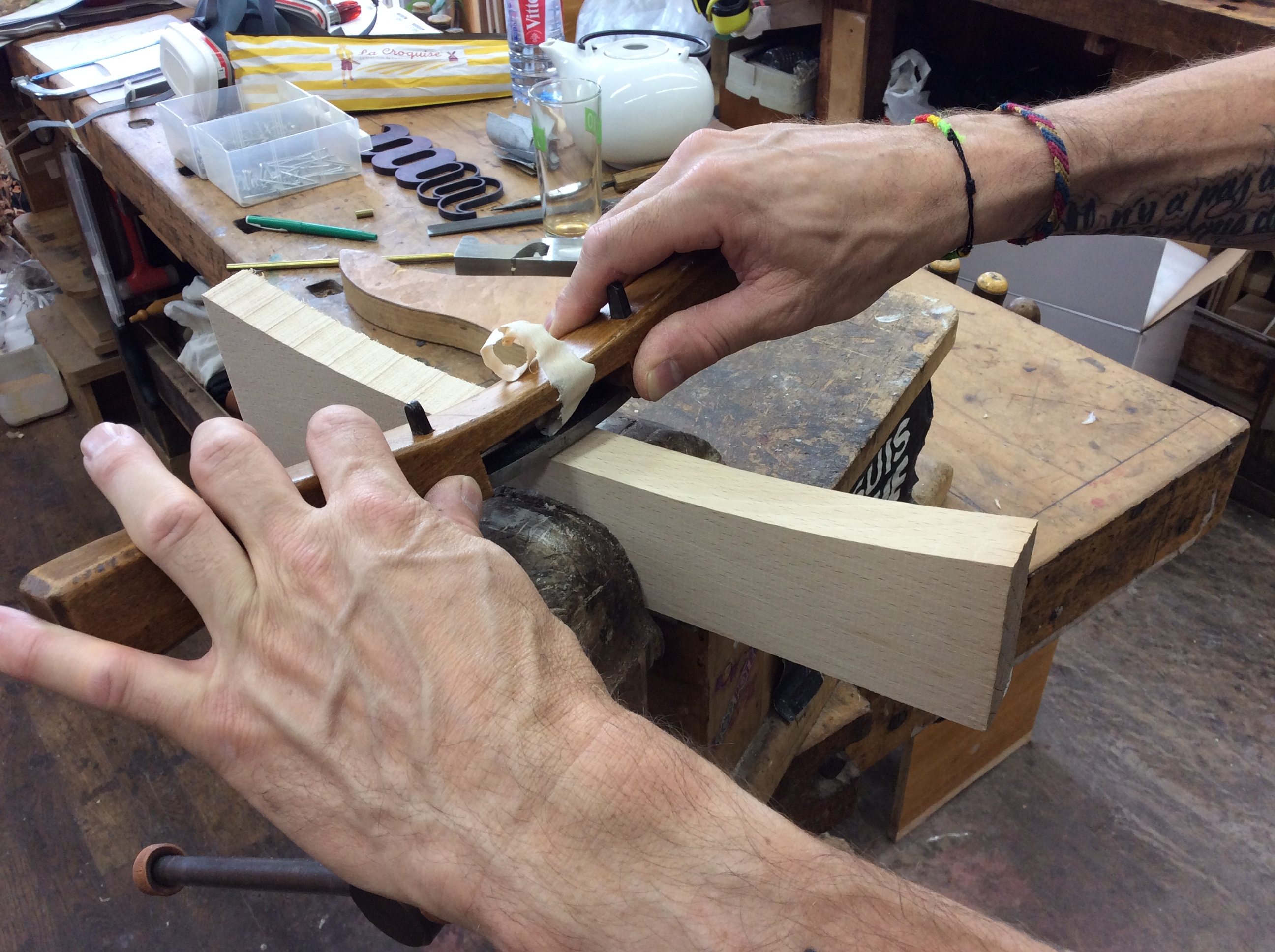
A wooden spokeshave in use

Spokeshaves are used two-handed and are either pushed or pulled depending on the circumstance. As with hand planes, spokeshaves are generally used 'with the grain' to reduce tear-out.

== See also ==
- Plane (tool)
- Drawknife
