= Scrub plane =

Type of hand tool for coarse wood work

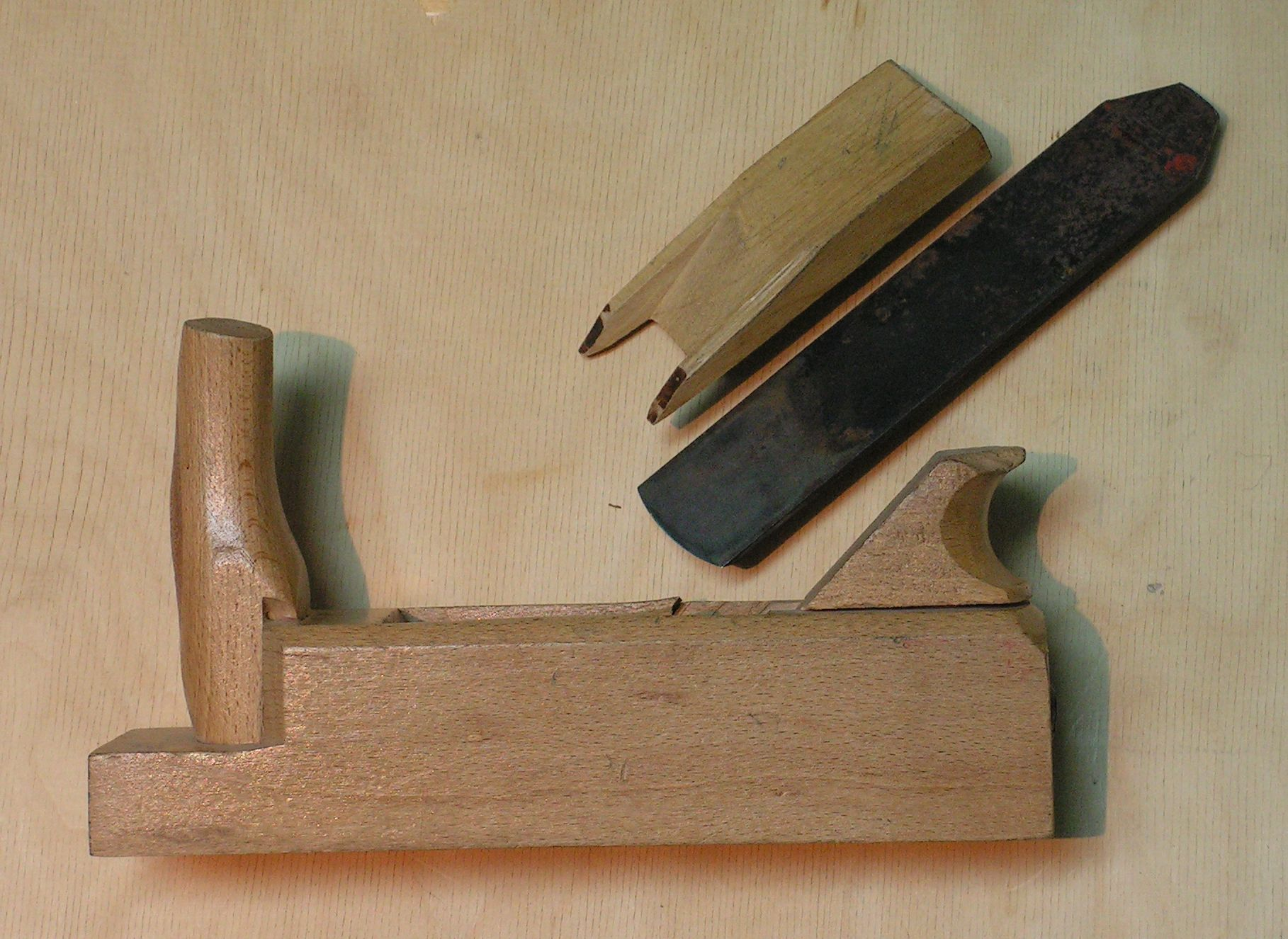
A scrub plane (parts)

The scrub plane is a type of plane used to remove large amounts of wood from the surface of lumber, such as when eliminating cup or twist in the first stages of preparing rough stock, or when reducing the thickness of a board significantly. Scrub planes generally have a short sole, a relatively narrow but thick blade, a very wide mouth, and a deeply curved edge (of about a 3 inch to 7 inch radius) to make a deep, gouging cut.

A scrub plane is generally used in diagonal strokes across the face of a board, rather than parallel to the length of the board (along the grain) as with most other bench planes. In thicknessing or preparing rough stock, the scrub plane is usually followed by the jack plane, jointer plane, then smoothing plane.

Its function in modern woodworking has been largely replaced by power tools such as the thickness planer. A scrub plane can still be useful for planing boards too wide to fit through a thickness planer.
