= Razee plane =

Type of hand tool for woodworking

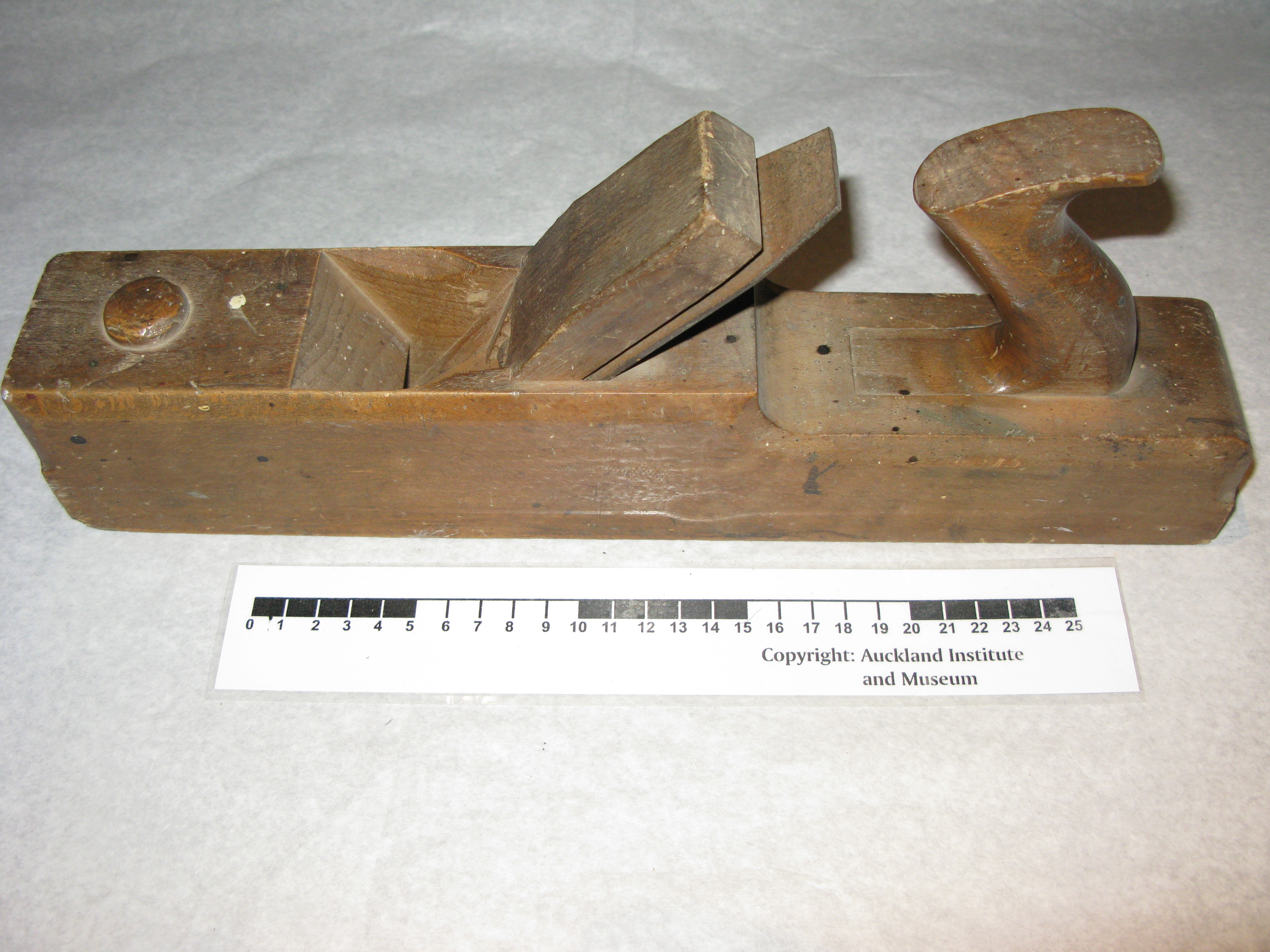
- A razee jack plane

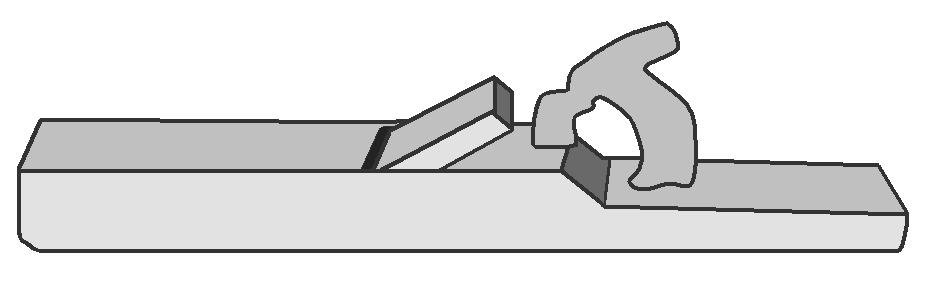
- A razee jointer plane
- Other names: Recess handle plane; Cutaway plane
- Classification: Type of wooden hand plane

A razee plane is a style of wooden hand plane which has a section of its rear cut away, so that the plane has a lower handle. This design makes the plane lighter, with a lower centre of mass, and puts the handle closer to the workpiece and cutting edge – giving the user greater control.

== Use ==
Historically, because they are lighter and easier to control, razee planes were often used in school and training workshops.

Despite their advantages razee planes are not as common, likely because they were originally slightly more expensive to buy.

== Etymology ==
The name razee may be derived from the historic razee ship conversion, in which a wooden sailing ship is modified by removing upper decks to lower the ship's centre of mass.
