= Fore plane =

Woodworking tool

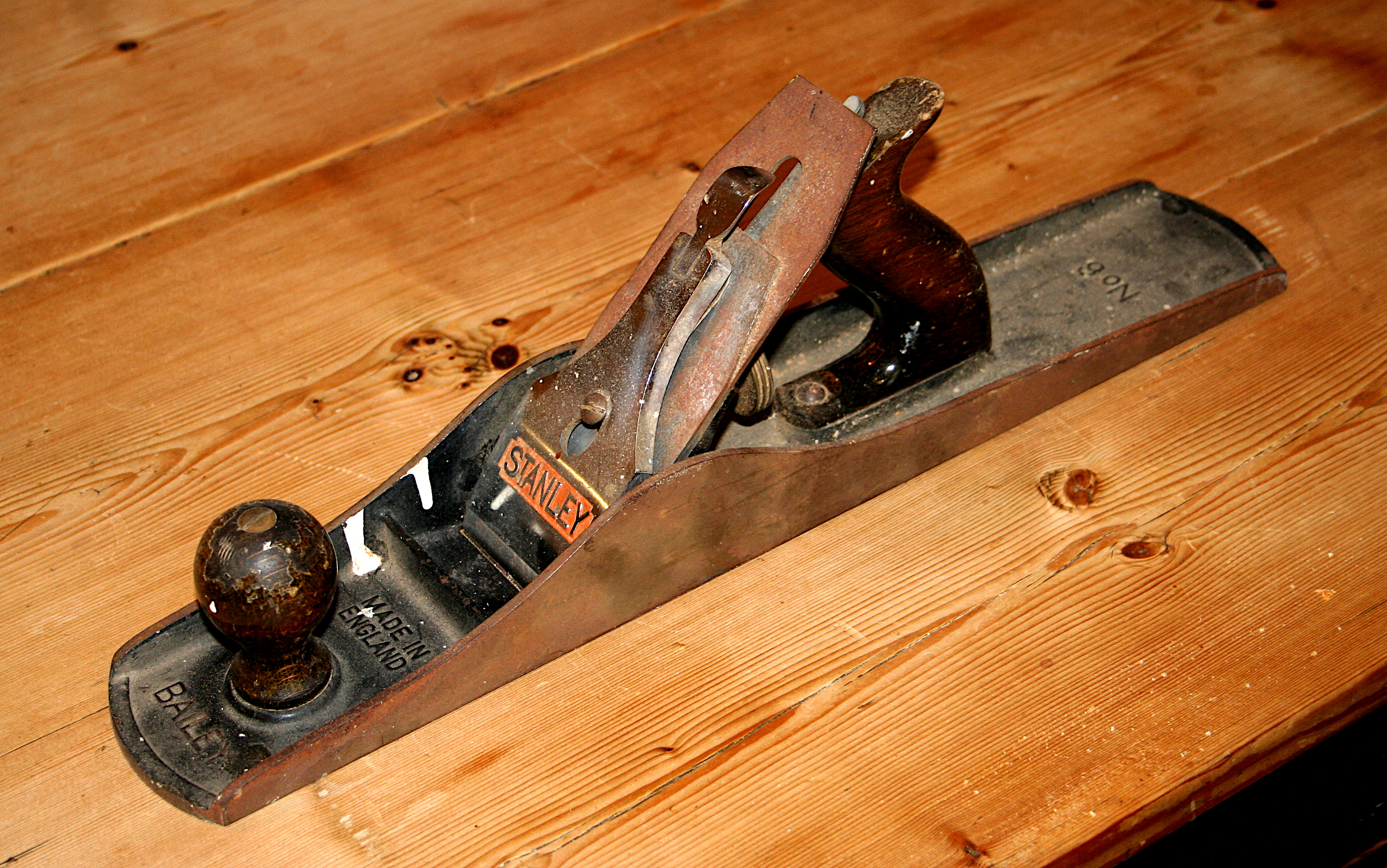
- A Stanley Bailey #6 fore plane
- Other names: Short jointer
- Types: Wooden-bodied; Iron-bodied; Transitional
- Used with: jointer plane and smoothing plane

Stanley Bailey No. 6 metal fore plane and No. 28 transitional fore plane.

The fore plane is a type of woodworking bench plane typically used for preparing and flattening rough workpieces before using other planes, such as the jointer plane and the smoothing plane. The name fore plane is sometimes used synonymously with the jack plane, but the fore plane is usually longer in length, making it more effective at levelling larger workpieces.

== Description ==
Under the Stanley Bailey numbering system for metal-bodied planes the #6 fore planes are 18 inches (460 mm) long, longer than the #5 jack planes and shorter than the #7 and #8 jointer planes. Historically, wooden-bodied fore planes have been 18 to 22 inches (460 to 560 mm) long. As with other bench planes, fore planes were first developed with wooden bodies, before the introduction in the 19th century of metal-bodied and transitional planes.

== Terminology ==
The name fore plane dates back to at least the 17th century in Britain, and was named fore plane because it would be used on a workpiece before other planes. The name fore plane is sometimes used synonymously with the jack plane, while in 17th century Britain the term fore plane was used more by joiners or cabinet makers, and jack plane by carpenters.

== Use ==
When used, the fore plane is either the first plane to be used on rough sawn timber, or is used after the jack plane. The fore plane is able to quickly remove material and level the workpiece before the woodworker moves on to using a jointer plane or smoothing plane. Often fore planes are used perpendicular and diagonally to the grain, and are set to remove larger shavings. The iron can also be sharpened with a slight camber to aid this.

For the rough preparation and levelling of stock fore planes have largely been replaced in modern workshops by machinery such as jointers and thicknessers.
