= Altendorf GmbH =

Altendorf GmbH & Co. KG Maschinenbau
- Company type: GmbH
- Industry: Forestry equipment, Landscape maintenance
- Founded: 1906; 120 years ago
- Headquarters: Minden, Germany
- Products: Table saw, Panel saw
- Number of employees: 400
- Website: Official Website

Altendorf GmbH & Co. KG Maschinenbau, located in Minden, Germany, is a producer of sliding table saw and panel saw used in cabinetry and carpentry. The company has been in the saw-manufacture business since 1906, and is viewed as one of the leading suppliers in the saw market worldwide. The company is based in the East Westphalian town of Minden.

On 25 April 2018, as part of a growth strategy, Altendorf Group acquired the edge banding manufacturer Hebrock for an undisclosed amount.

== History ==
=== Development of the Altendorf panel saw system ===
In 1906, Wilhelm Altendorf, a furniture designer and draughtsman, established a factory for business equipment in Berlin. Unsatisfied with the woodworking machines available at the time, Altendorf designed his own to better suit his needs. For the production of his furniture designs, he developed a saw where the workpiece is guided through the saw blade on a sliding carriage, marking the creation of the world's first sizing and trimming circular saw. By 1914, the success of his designs and machines had allowed the company to expand to around 50 employees.

=== World Wars and Great Depression ===
In 1919, Altendorf relocated his company headquarters from Berlin to Minden, Westphalia, due to the challenging conditions in Berlin following World War I. In 1929, Wilhelm's first-born son, Willy Altendorf, completed his engineering exams and joined the family business. Wilhelm Altendorf's inventiveness played a crucial role in sustaining the business through the difficult first half of the 20th century. To offset the waning demand for woodworking machines, he developed a variety of products, including a car with a wooden body, a cigarillo manufacturing machine, and one of the first prefabricated houses. In 1939, he introduced the world's first high chair for children. Following Wilhelm's death in 1948, his sons Willy and Kurt took over the management of the company.

=== 1956 to the present ===
In 1956, Willy and Kurt Altendorf made a strategic decision to focus exclusively on the production and continuous development of their panel and edging circular saw. The company began to increase its export activities in the 1950s, expanding its global reach. By the mid-1980s, Altendorf established its first foreign subsidiary in the USA and began setting up sales agencies internationally under its own brand name. In 1995, they established a production facility in Qinhuangdao, China.

In 2006, Altendorf celebrated its centennial anniversary. In 2010, the company's significant contributions were recognised when it was included in the Lexicon of German World Market Leaders.

On October 6, 2017, Avedon Capital Partners, along with Jörg F. Mayer and Wolfgang Ruhnau, acquired the company shares from Wilfried and Tom Altendorf. The acquisition marked the complete withdrawal of the Altendorf family from the company, ending their involvement which had spanned across the third and fourth generations in various roles within the management and advisory boards.

Altendorf operates two production facilities in Germany and maintains additional manufacturing sites in Brazil and China. The company has further extended its international presence with subsidiaries in Australia, Brazil, China, and Southeast Asia, to serve a global customer base. To date, Altendorf has produced over 150,000 sliding table saws, which are utilised in joineries, carpentry workshops, and various companies processing wood, metal, and plastic around the world. The company manufactures more than 2,400 sliding table saws annually.

== Generations ==
- Wilhelm Altendorf (1874–1948): Inventor of the panel saw and company founder
- Kurt Altendorf (1910–2005): Managing partner until 2002, father of Wilfried Altendorf
- Willy Altendorf (1904–1995): Managing partner until 1995
- Siegfried Thiele (born 1934): Managing partner until 2003
- Wilfried Altendorf (born 1941): Managing partner until 2013
- Tom Altendorf (born 1976): Managing partner until 2017

== Locations ==
In addition to its main production facility in Minden, Westphalia, Altendorf operates a facility in China. Alongside these production facilities, the company operates sales and service centers located in Bangalore, India; Gaspar, Brazil; and Sydney, Australia.

The service and sales center at the company's headquarters in Minden was inaugurated in 2006. This center includes numerous offices and features an exhibition area that showcases the evolution of the Altendorf sliding table saw and displays new machine models. The facility is equipped with rooms designed for hosting training courses and presentations.

In 2015, Altendorf further expanded its sales network by establishing a Sales Centre East in Sydney, Australia, and a Sales Centre West at the Altendorf headquarters in Minden, Germany.

== Acquisitions ==
Altendorf acquired Hebrock, a family-owned manufacturer of edge stinging machines in 2018.

== Products ==
All sliding table saws produced by the Altendorf company adhere to the foundational design of the original Altendorf system. An example of an original Altendorf sliding table saw from 1907 is on display at the Tischlerei-Museum in Bremen, showcasing the history of the company's innovations.

Today, Altendorf offers a selection of five different machine types to accommodate various budgets and applications. These models include the Altendorf F 45, WA 80, WA 8, START 45, and WA 6. Each model is customisable and capable of cutting both wood and plastic.

== Awards and Recognitions for Altendorf ==
Altendorf has been recognised for its design and innovation in sliding table saws. Notably, the company received the iF gold award in 2007 for the F45 Elmo sliding table saw among others.

List of Awards:

- 2024: 'Best of German Industry' award from ZEIT Verlagsgruppe. 2020: OWL Innovation Award for Hand Guard
- 2016: iF Product Design Award, Hanover
- 2013: iF Product Design Award and iF Communication Design Award, Hanover
- 2008: iF Product Design Award, Hanover
- 2007: iF gold award, Hanover
- 2004: iF Product Design Award, Hanover
- 2002: iF Product Design Award, Hanover
- 1999: iF Product Design Award, Hanover
- 1998: Challengers Award, Atlanta, USA
- 1997: iF Product Design Award, Hanover
- 1995: Eumacop Ergonomics Award
- 1993: Industry Design Award, North Rhine-Westphalia

Altendorf received the German Occupational Safety and Health Award in 2021 for their circular saw safety systems, from the Gemeinsame Deutsche Arbeitsschutzstrategie (GDA) (en: Common German Occupational Safety and Health Strategy). They additionally received the Innovator of the Year 2022 business award on November 4, 2022, from the Deutsche Wirtschaft, presented by Professor Hermann Simon. In 2024, Altendorf received the 'Best of German Industry' award from ZEIT Verlagsgruppe.

== See also ==
- Woodworking machine
