= The Namesake (NCIS) =

- NCIS episode
- Episode no.: Season 10; Episode 5
- Directed by: Arvin Brown
- Written by: George Schenck and Frank Cardea
- Original air date: October 30, 2012

Guest appearances
- Ralph Waite as Jackson Gibbs; Billy Dee Williams as Leroy Jethro Moore; Piter Marek as Vijay Chaya; Brett Davern as Krist Taylor; Jake Thomas as Alec Dell; Debra Christofferson as Rita Gregg; Edwin Hodge as Bodie; Julie McNiven as Kim Taylor; Jonathan Camp as Petty Officer First Class Colin Boxer; Tierra Carlson as Chaya's Girlfriend

Episode chronology
← Previous "Lost at Sea"	Next → "Shell Shock (Part I)"
- NCIS season 10

"The Namesake" is the fifth episode of the tenth season of the American police procedural drama NCIS, and the 215th episode overall. It originally aired on CBS in the United States on October 30, 2012. The episode is written by George Schenck and Frank Cardea and directed by Arvin Brown, and was seen by 18.83 million viewers.

== Plot ==
A Navy Petty Officer is fatally shot during a late-night joyride in an expensive Ferrari sports car. The gun used in the murder is traced to a local pawn shop, where Gibbs and Tony are surprised to see a Medal of Honor on display. The pawnbroker says she bought it from an elderly World War II veteran who needed the money badly, despite the fact that buying or selling a Medal of Honor is illegal. Reading the citation that came with the Medal, Gibbs is shocked to recognize the name: Leroy Jethro Moore, his father's best friend and Gibbs's own namesake. Gibbs reveals that Moore was his boyhood hero, and his actions on Iwo Jima inspired the young Gibbs's own decision to join the Marine Corps.

While the rest of the team is investigating the murder, Gibbs tracks down Moore at a local retirement home. Moore says he is in good health, but needed the money to help fix the electric lift used by the home's more frail residents. Gibbs remembers that Moore left Stillwater after a falling-out between Moore and his father, but Gibbs never knew why. Moore is reluctant to say, but when Gibbs confronts his father, Jackson angrily says that Moore allowed Gibbs's mother to commit suicide by drug overdose in order to end her suffering from terminal cancer, something that Jackson never forgave him for.

Additional investigation reveals that the deceased Petty Officer worked part-time as a valet, and "borrowed" the sports car for a joyride. The team also traces ownership of the gun to a local university student. His true target was the car's actual owner, a billionaire entrepreneur who he believed stole his idea for a filesharing network, and the Petty Officer was killed as aresult of a mistaken identification. The suspect is quickly apprehended.

Gibbs forces his father and Moore to meet for the first time in years, and convinces them to end their feud, pointing out that all three of them shared common ground in their love for Gibbs's mother. Jackson and Moore finally make amends and renew their friendship. Jackson redeems the Medal from the pawn shop and returns it to Moore, inviting him to move back to Stillwater.

Gibbs installs a vintage Shopsmith Model 10ER combination machine that he purchased from the pawn shop in his basement, and is pleased to see that his father successfully mended a coffee mug of Gibbs's that he smashed earlier in anger at Moore - an apt metaphor for how the two old veterans have mended their friendship.

The episode is "Dedicated to The Montford Point Marines. Honored with The Congressional Gold Medal. June 27, 2012"

== Production ==
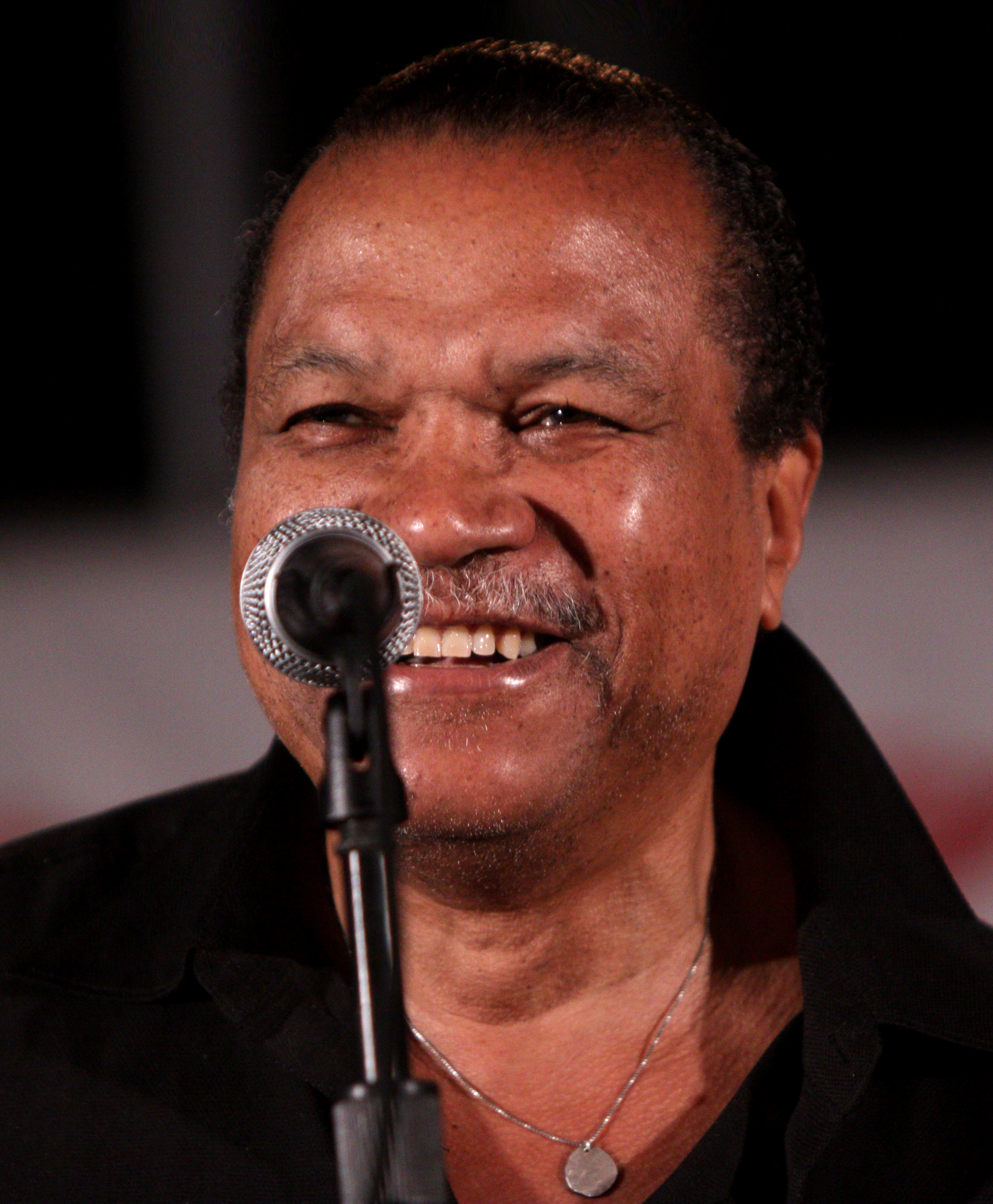
Billy Dee Williams guest starred as Gibbs' namesake Leroy Jethro Moore.

"The Namesake" is written by George Schenck and Frank Cardea and directed by Arvin Brown. Schenck and Cardea wanted the episode to reveal the story behind Gibbs' birthname. To do so, they introduced Gibbs' namesake, the World War II veteran he was named after. "The initial intent of the episode was to explore the origin of Gibbs' given name, Leroy Jethro. It had been established in the "Heartland" episode in Season Six that Gibbs was named after his father's boyhood friend and business partner." The picture of Billy Dee Williams and president Clinton shown in the episode is real, and the producers only needed to "matte the medal around his neck" to use it.

According to Williams, Leroy Jethro Moore could recur on NCIS. "That's the whole idea, that he's recurring character. I think they were happy about the way things turn out, so I would suspect I'd be back on there."

== Reception ==
"The Namesake" was seen by 18.83 million live viewers following its broadcast on October 30, 2012, with a 3.4/9 share among adults aged 18 to 49. A rating point represents one percent of the total number of television sets in American households, and a share means the percentage of television sets in use tuned to the program. In total viewers, "The Namesake" easily won NCIS and CBS the night. The spin-off NCIS: Los Angeles drew second and was seen by 16.28 million viewers. The episode also was the second most watched television program the week it aired. Compared to last week's episode "Lost at Sea", "The Namesake" was up in both viewers and adults 18-49.

Carla Day from TV Fanatic gave the episode 4.0 (out of 5) and stated that "The course of the NCIS investigation seemed off to me. As soon as NCIS found out that Colin Boxer took the car for a joy ride, I assumed that he was killed by mistake. Maybe I've just watched too many procedural shows, but a fancy car like that draws attention."
