= Shopsmith =

Woodworking machinery manufacturer

Shopsmith L.P.
- Company type: Limited Partnership
- Industry: Manufacturing
- Founded: Late 1940s as Magna Engineering Corporation reestablished 1972 as Shopsmith Inc. rebranded 2009 as RLF Brands rebranded 2023 as Shopsmith L.P.
- Founder: Hans Goldschmidt
- Products: Woodworking tools
- Brands: Shopsmith
- Revenue: $9.9M (2023)
- Number of employees: 50
- Website: www.shopsmith.com

Shopsmith L.P. is a US manufacturer of ShopSmith combination machines for woodworking. The brand originated with the ShopSmith 10ER launched in the late 1940s which found success with the large number of new post-war homeowners.

== Origin and company history ==
The ShopSmith, a five-in-one woodworking tool, was invented in the late 1940s by Hans Goldschmidt and marketed to do-it-yourself homeowners in the years after World War II. The original model was the 10E. It, and the subsequent ShopSmith 10ER, combined a table saw, lathe, drill press, disc sander and horizontal boring machine in one compact assembly. Goldschmidt founded the Magna Engineering Corporation, in San Francisco, California, to manufacture his ShopSmith tools.

Successive models added more accessories including bandsaw, jigsaw, jointer and belt sander. Yuba Power Products of Cleveland, Ohio, a lawn and garden tool manufacturer, bought Magna and the ShopSmith product line in the late 1950s. A few years later a group of Yuba employees founded Magna American Corporation, purchased the ShopSmith assets from Yuba and began manufacturing in Raymond, Mississippi with new models including the Mark 2 and Mark V. Magna American ceased operations by 1966.

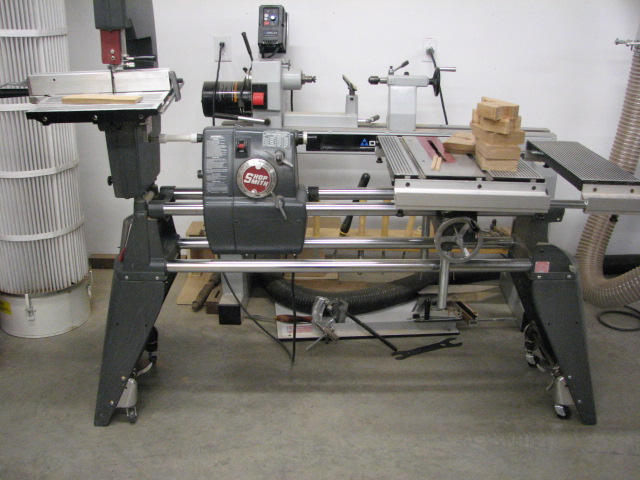
Shopsmith Mark V, Model 520

When searching for a replacement saw blade John Folkerth, a stockbroker in Dayton, Ohio, discovered the Magna American plant had been shuttered with the manufacturing equipment and boxes of unfilled orders left behind. He obtained investors and launched Shopsmith Inc. in 1972 to resume manufacturing spare parts for the old tools in Troy, Ohio. The company soon decided to resume manufacturing complete tools based on the Mark V. The company moved to Dayton, Ohio in the late 1970s. Around the end of 1981 McGraw-Edison sold its Benchmark and Shopcraft power-tool division to Shopsmith, Inc. who then began to manufacture and market the tools. ShopSmith also acquired four new safety tools from this purchase which they incorporated into their ShopSmith marketing packages. In April 2005 the company reported gross annual revenues of US$13.4 million, with a net loss of US$800,000.

The Mark V 500 model was retired in 1985 and replaced with the Mark V 505, 510, and 520 models. The 505/510 models were introduced in 1985 and the 520 in 1999. The 505/510/520 models offer larger tables and greater flexibility, using a combination of tubes and telescoping legs which allow the tables to be placed in a variety of positions. Additional accessories were added, including an air compressor, and planer, and a variety of stands also began production, allowing many of the accessories to be used separately from the MKV, with a separate motor.

Shopsmith Inc. filed for bankruptcy in 2009 and reorganized, at first under the name of RLF Shop. RLF Brands LLC was registered in Ohio as a Domestic Limited Liability Company on 1 June 2010. In 2010 the company added the newest Mark 7 model, which offers a digitally controlled motor with reverse, and a double tilt mechanism. The new design offers greater power, constant torque, and more flexibility. In 2023, The Mark 7 model was upgraded to the Generation 2 which had a larger screen display and added diagnostics for the electronic display. Additional overload protection was also provided. As of 2014 the company continued to market the Shopsmith MARK V and MARK 7 multipurpose tools, with seven different tools and various accessories. On June 6, 2023, Nicholas Cupps filed a Form D, Notice of Exempt Offering of Securities, with The Securities and Exchange Commission thus creating a limited partnership named Shopsmith L.P. to take ownership of the assets of RLF Brands. A rebuilt website was launched and marketing staff were hired to increase social media presence. The most recent owners also hosted large events at their factory for ShopSmith tool users. Representatives of Shopsmith L.P. attended and exhibited for the first time at the annual WorkbenchCon in Atlanta, GA in February 2024, where they offered hands-on demonstrations of the Shopsmith MARK 7 multipurpose tool, and the DC6000 dust collector.

In September 2025, the company's owners posted a message on their website announcing they were suspending operations and looking for a new buyer to purchase the company. In January 2026, the company was purchased by a group named Shopsmith USA, headed by Andrew Deutsch.

== Products ==
- ShopSmith (models include the original 10E and subsequent 10ER, MK2, MK5, Mark V (in 500, 505, 510, and 520 series), and Mark 7.
  - SPTs (Single Purpose Or Special Purpose Tools) are add-on tools that can draw their power from the headstock. They include the 4 inch jointer, the 11 inch bandsaw, the strip sander, the belt sander, the planer, the jigsaw, the 20 inch scroll saw. All of the SPTs are made to fit onto the system and a power coupler to connect to the headstock and drive the SPT.
- SawSmith 2000 (Models: Standard, Pro, Deluxe and Ultra), a combination table saw and radial arm saw, expandable depending on which of the four models was purchased.
- Benchmark and Shopcraft, small, stand-alone, benchtop power tools including band saw, drill press, grinder and lathe.

== Sources ==
- Joslin, Jeff (2014-01-05). "McGraw-Edison Co". Vintage Machinery.
- Patent Place USA (2006-08-06). "Finding Hidden Shopsmith Tools, Aftermarket Accessories".
- "Rlf Brands, Llc". Companies Ohio.
- "Rlfshop LLC Company Profile". Hoovers.
- "Shopsmith Inc (SSMH:OTC US) Financials". Bloomberg Businessweek.
- "Shopsmith, Inc". Vintage Machinery.
- "Shopsmith Mark 7 and Mark V Multipurpose Tools". Shopsmith Inc.
