= EMCO =

EMCO or Emco may refer to:

- Emco, a manufacturing company and maker of Unimat
- EMCO Enterprises, a subsidiary of the Andersen Corporation
- Enhanced Movement Control Order, part of the Malaysian movement control order
- A typo for ECMO, extracorporeal membrane oxygenation (respiratory support medical equipment)
- Extended Minimum Crew Operations (eMCO), see single pilot operations
