= Snipe (wood machining) =

Type of undesirable cut in woodworking

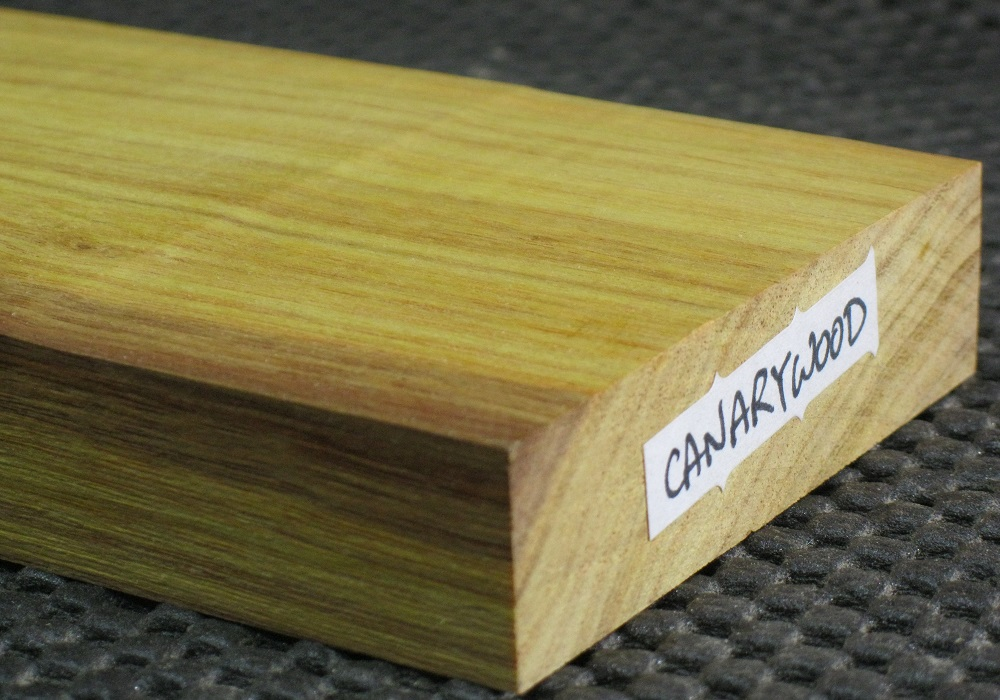
A commercially milled canarywood board showing snipe of 0.013 inches (0.33 mm) for the first 1 7/8 inches (48 mm).

Snipe, in woodworking, is a noticeably deeper cut on the leading and/or trailing end of a board after having passed through a thickness planer or jointer. The term has its origin in forestry where it is applied to a sloping surface or bevel cut on the fore end of a log to ease dragging. (OED)

== Snipe in Jointers ==
The cause of snipe in a jointer, is an out-feed table which is set too low relative to the cutter head.

== Snipe in Thickness Planers ==
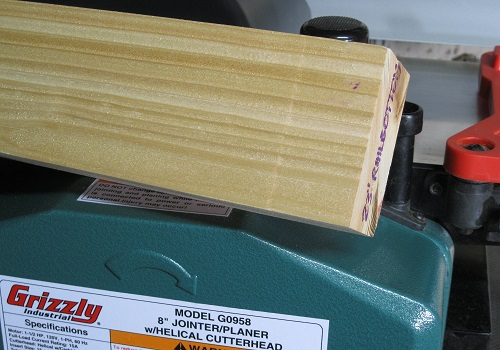
A white cedar board showing snipe of 0.005 inches (0.13 mm) for 1 1/2 inches (38 mm) after passing through a thickness planer.

The predominant cause of snipe in a thickness planer is change in the downward force applied to the workpiece by the feed rollers and the resultant movement of the planer table.

The rollers are pulled down by springs. When the workpiece is absent, they rest on stops in the frame of the planer. When the workpiece passes under a roller, the roller is lifted from the stops and the spring force presses the workpiece down onto the table. This holds it steady as it passes under the cutter head and creates the friction which allows the rollers to move it through the planer.

The pressure of the roller(s) on the workpiece and thence onto the planer table will inevitably cause the table to move down, i.e. away from the roller / cutter head assembly. To save cost and weight, the table may be a fairly thin plate with reinforcing ribs. This can flex by several thousandths of an inch (hundredths of a millimeter) due to a pressure of some tens of pounds force per roller. Other parts of the mechanism may also exhibit strain.

A workpiece fed into the planer first meets the infeed roller, passes under it and continues towards the cutter head. When the cut begins, the table is being pressed down by the infeed roller only and is deflected downward accordingly. The cut then progresses to the point where the workpiece meets the outfeed roller. As it passes under, the downward force of this roller is added to the infeed roller and the table is deflected an additional amount.

The downward movement of the table increases its distance from the roller / cutter head assembly. The workpiece, riding on the table, moves away from the cutter head. From the point of view of the workpiece, the cutter head has moved up and cuts less deeply. The part of the workpiece that passed the cutter head before engagement of the outfeed roller was cut more deeply than when both rollers are engaged. This is snipe. The length of the leading edge affected by snipe will be approximately the horizontal separation of the cutter head and the outfeed roller (the truth of this observation is evidence of the correctness of this explanation).

The table remains at full downward deflection until the trailing end of the workpiece disengages from the infeed roller. Now only the outfeed roller is pressing down through the workpiece and the table springs back up. This brings the workpiece closer to the roller / cutter head assembly and increases the depth of cut, again causing snipe. The length of the trailing edge affected by snipe will be approximately the horizontal separation of the infeed roller and the cutter head.

Some planers have a fixed table at the bottom of the frame and the roller / cutter head assembly moves up and down to set the thickness. The cause of snipe is essentially the same except that the table is likely to be stiffer and it is easier to think of the cutter moving upwards due to the roller pressure.

== Dealing with Snipe in Thickness Planers ==
In many applications, for example, general carpentry, snipe may be of little consequence and can be ignored. In other situations, for example, furniture making, it is unacceptable.

=== Choice of Planer, Technique and Modifications ===
With a small, moderately priced combination jointer/planer the change in depth of cut can be in the range 0.003 to 0.005 inches (0.08 to 0.13 mm). A larger, more expensive planer should provide a stiffer table and result in snipe of 0.002 inches (0.05 mm) or below. In oral discussion, professional woodworkers at a premiere art show reported essentially zero snipe with large, floor-standing planers.

Some planers feature a lock which, when engaged, supports the table or cutter head assembly more firmly than the mechanism that raises and lowers it.

The last pass of a workpiece through the machine establishes the final thickness and flatness. With a little planning, the depth of this cut can be well below the maximum. Operating at reduced stress will allow the planer to do the best possible job.

For a short workpiece, it is feasible to make a sled on which it rides through the planer. If the sled is sturdy and as wide as the bed it may reduce movement in response to roller pressure and produce less snipe.

=== Removing Snipe After Planing ===
If the loss of thickness can be allowed for, snipe can be removed by a pass over a jointer or through a drum sander. With some loss of flatness, snipe can be sanded away by hand or with a hand-held power sander.

The workpiece can be milled longer than needed so that the ends exhibiting snipe can then be cut off and discarded.

=== Snipe Blocks, Rails, etc. ===
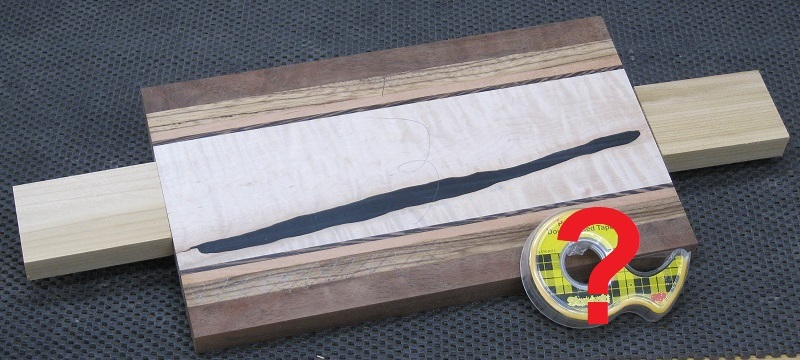
A charcuterie board prepared for thicknessing with leading and trailing snipe blocks.

A less wasteful procedure than discarding the snipe is to make up extra pieces of stock of the same thickness as the workpiece and feed them before and after to "collect" the snipe. What they're really doing is picking up the pressure of the outfeed roller before the workpiece meets the cutter head and holding on to the pressure of the infeed roller after the workpiece leaves the cutter head. These pieces don't have to be "fresh" for each workpiece in a run; that is, they don't have to be of the unplaned thickness. They work well enough if they are of the final thickness and so can be reused. A run of several workpieces can start with an extra piece, then the work can be fed in quick succession and an extra piece (or the same extra piece) passed through at the end.

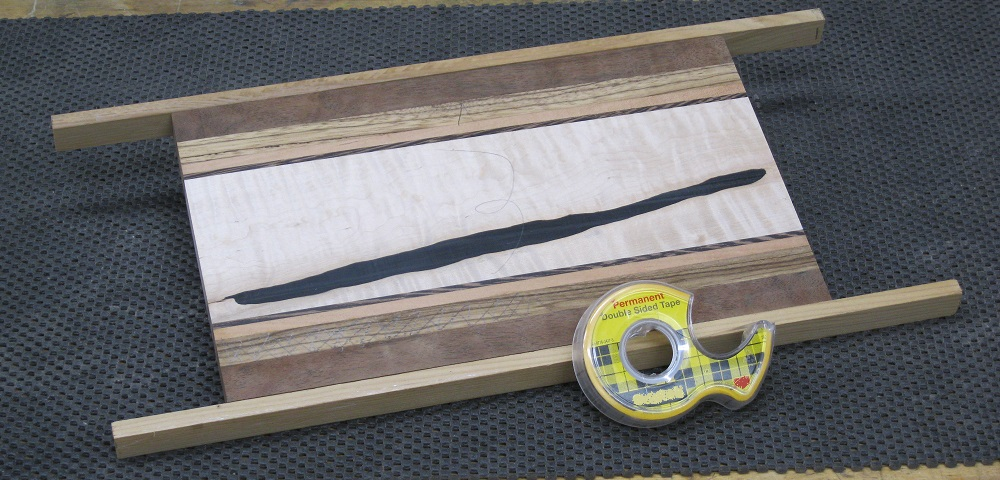
A charcuterie board prepared for thicknessing with side rails to avoid snipe.

Depending on the design of the planer, feeding successive pieces nose-to-tail without gaps may be challenging. If the planer is wide enough, they can be fed side-by-side and overlapping, but the result should be checked for other problems due to the pieces not being on center. A better solution (although much more work) is to make up a "frame" with rails that run right and left of the workpiece, entering before it to pick up the infeed roller and remaining after it to hold the outfeed roller. As with the extra pieces, above, the frame will work well enough if it is of the planed thickness and so can be reused for all the work in a run.

== Other Sources of Thickness Variation in Planers ==
Incorrect adjustment of a planer and poor technique can result in thickness variation that may be mistaken for snipe (or lumped together with snipe in discussion). To get the best results, manufacturers' recommendations and established good practice should be followed.

Non-standard adjustments, such as raising infeed and outfeed tables above the main planer table, are unlikely to reduce snipe and may be the cause of problems, perhaps termed snipe, that are hard to understand and deal with. In this example, the consequence of a raised infeed table will be that the tail of the workpiece will snap suddenly down onto the main table as it nears the end of the pass. How this might manifest as thickness variation is hard to predict.

The same goes for modifications to feed technique, such as lifting the outside end of the workpiece up at an angle as it enters and leaves the planer.

The work should enter and leave the planer without being pushed down, up or to the side to any degree that affects the function of the feed rollers. Long pieces should be supported level with the planer table by any convenient method (stands / roller supports or by hand). If the planer has extension infeed and outfeed tables to help with this, they should be set at the same height as the main table under the cutter head.

== Measuring Snipe ==
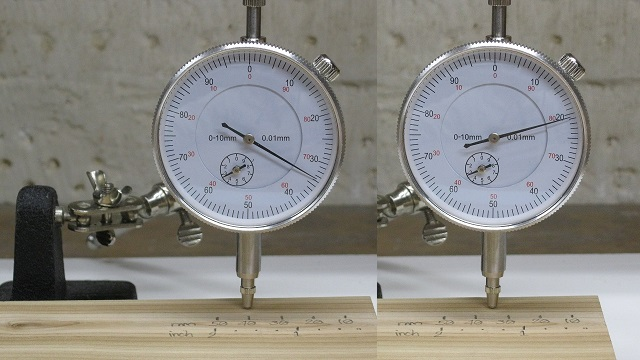
Measuring planer snipe with a dial indicator.

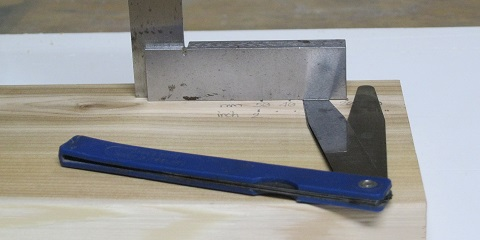
Measuring planer snipe with a straight edge and a feeler gauge.

Knowing how much snipe is present allows for better planning in mitigating it. This information is often missing or clearly wrong in discussions of the subject. Nevertheless, measuring a step in the surface of a piece of wood should not be an insurmountable problem. This is a classic application of a dial indicator. Also, a straight edge can be placed on the unaffected surface of the workpiece and the drop to the sniped area measured with a feeler gauge. Calipers (vernier, digital, etc.) could be used if the back surface can be relied upon to be flat and smooth.

=== Recording Planer Table Depression ===
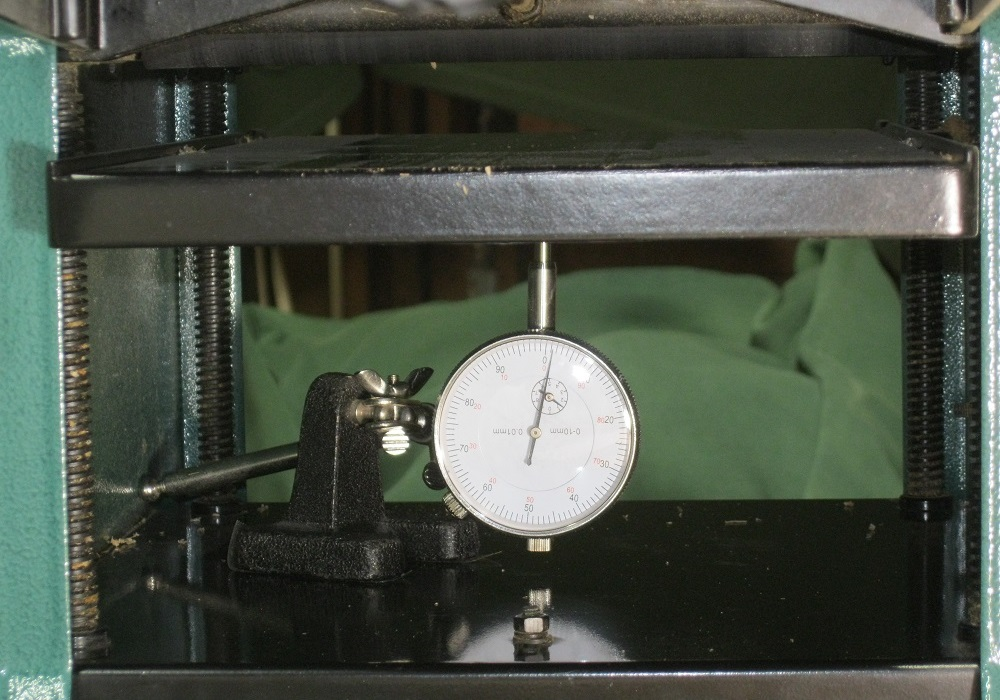
A dial indicator recording vertical table movement in a thickness planer.

Planer table depression recorded by a dial indicator and video camera.

If the thickness planer is of a suitable design, movement of the planer table due to feed roller pressure can be recorded using a dial indicator. The pattern of movement can be analyzed to verify that the cause of snipe is properly understood.

The photograph at right shows such an arrangement using a small combination jointer/planer. The indicator's stand rests on the base plate of the planer frame. The probe touches the underside of the planer table directly below the middle of the cutter head. The leadscrews, which can be clearly seen to the left and right, support the table about one inch (25 mm) below the cutter head. A piece of white cedar about 12 inches long, four inches wide and just over one inch thick was passed through the planer to execute a cut of moderate depth.

The indicator reading was recorded with a video camera. Video editing software was used to generate images for each frame (30 per second) and the images were inspected to obtain the indicator readings. The readings were then entered into a spreadsheet program, processed and used to produce a graph, also at right. Time (computed from the frame number) is plotted horizontally (refer to the top X axis). Knowing the feed rate (a little under 4.4 inches per second), the distance traveled by the workpiece can also be read from the graph (refer to the bottom X axis). Downward displacement as measured by the indicator (from an arbitrary zero) is plotted vertically, in inches on the left and in mm on the right. However, the plot line moves up as the table moves down, so that its shape can be viewed as a very exaggerated profile of the cut produced on the top surface of the workpiece (in the absence of factors not captured, such as movement of the base plate or cutter head). Specifically, the end of the sniped section at the leading end of the workpiece is clearly visible at C and the start of the sniped section at the trailing end at D. A more thorough analysis follows.

At A, the workpiece contacts the infeed roller, is pulled under it by the rotation and is pressed onto the planer table. This pressure causes the planer table to move down, in this case by about 0.005 inches. When the workpiece is not present, the feed rollers rest on stops on the planer frame. They only need to lift off the stops for the full downward force applied to them by their springs to appear on the workpiece and thus on the table.

At B (about one-and-a-half inches beyond A), the leading edge of the workpiece reaches the cutter head and material removal begins according to the height of the cutter head above the table.

At C (about one-and-a-half inches beyond B), the workpiece has moved past the cutter head far enough that it meets and passes under the outfeed roller. As with the infeed roller, this lifts from its stops and presses the workpiece down onto the table, increasing the downward movement of the table, in this case by about 0.004 inches. The table moving down increases the height of the cutter head above the table, so the planer cuts less deeply and the finished piece is thicker. This is observed as the transition from the sniped section to the main section of the piece.

At D, the workpiece comes out from under the infeed roller. The roller drops back onto its stops in the planer frame and no longer presses the workpiece down onto the table. Released from this pressure, the table rises back up, here by about 0.004 inches. The table moving up decreases the height of the cutter head above the table, so the planer cuts more deeply and the sniped section of the trailing end begins. (The feed distance from A to D is 12 inches, the length of the workpiece.)

At E (about one-and-a-half inches beyond D), the workpiece passes the cutter head and material removal ends.

At F (about one-and-a-half inches beyond E), the workpiece disengages from the outfeed roller. This roller also returns to its stops and pressure on the workpiece and table ends. The table rises to its rest position.

Superimposed on the table movement attributed to the workpiece passing under one, then two, then one feed roller, is a tendency for the table to rise as the workpiece passes under the cutter head and becomes centered on the table. It then moves back down as the workpiece continues past the center and toward the outfeed side. It might be conjectured that the cutterhead applies an upward force to the workpiece to remove material and that this distributes differently according to its position. Further investigation would be needed for a scientific explanation. Nevertheless, the evidence for the correctness of the explanation for snipe given in this article is compelling.

- The magnitude of the vertical movement of the table at C and D closely matches the depth of snipe on the workpiece.
- The feed travel between cutter head contact (at B) and downward table movement (at C), which is equal to the separation of the cutter head and the outfeed roller in the planer, matches the length of the sniped section on the leading end of the workpiece.
- The feed travel between upward table movement (at D) and loss of cutter head contact (at E), which is equal to the separation of the infeed roller and the cutter head, matches the length of the sniped section on the trailing end of the workpiece.
