= Boring machine =

Boring machine may refer to:

- Boring machine (carpentry)
- A machine for boring (manufacturing) holes
- Tunnel boring machine

== See also ==
- Boring (disambiguation)
