= Woodworking machine =

Fixed machine tool used for processing wood

A Woodworking machine is a machine that is intended to process wood. These machines are usually powered by electric motors and are used extensively in woodworking. Sometimes grinding machines (used for grinding down to smaller pieces) are also considered a part of woodworking machinery.

== Types of woodworking machinery ==
=== Artisanal and hobby machines ===
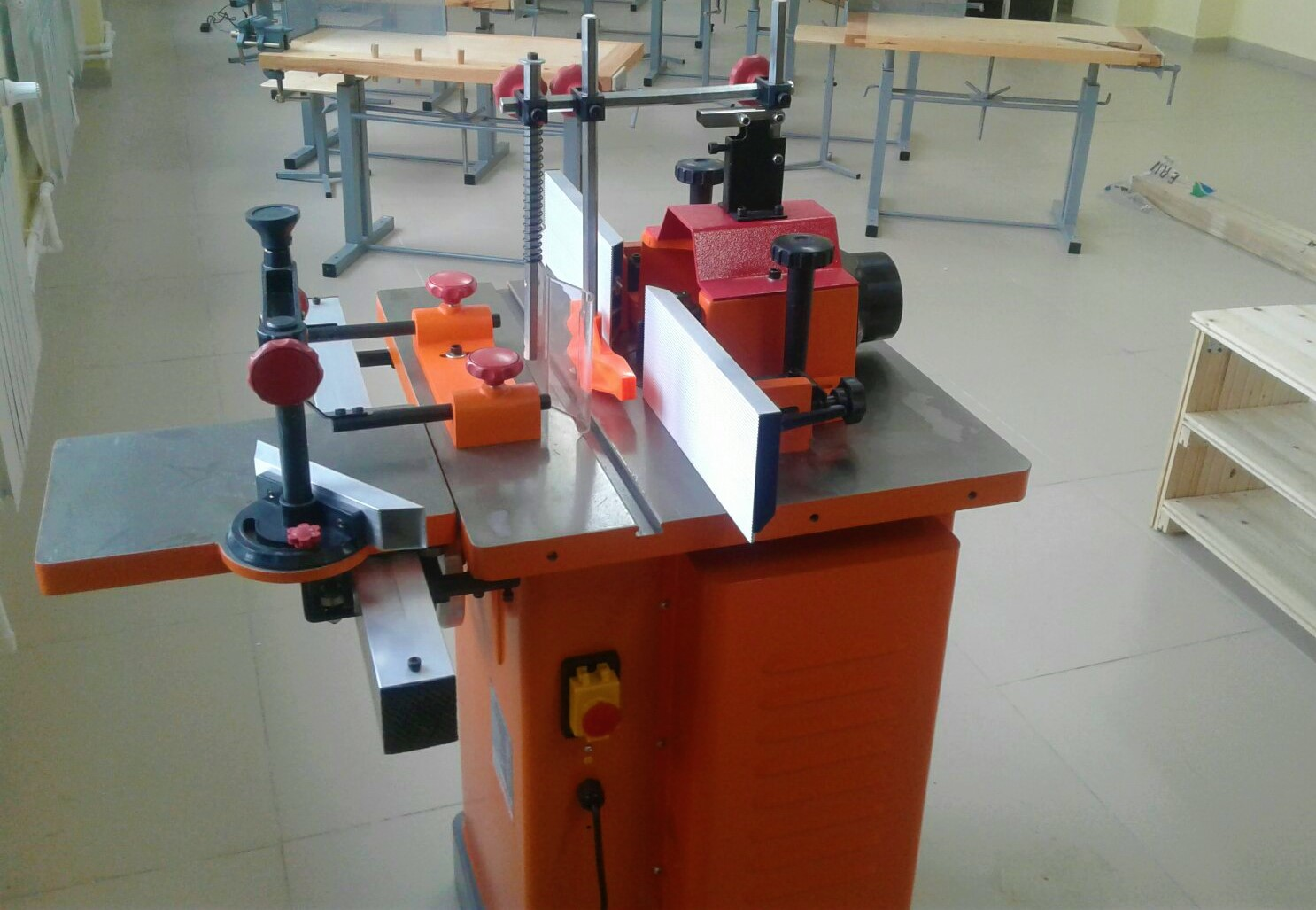
Woodworking milling machine in school workshop

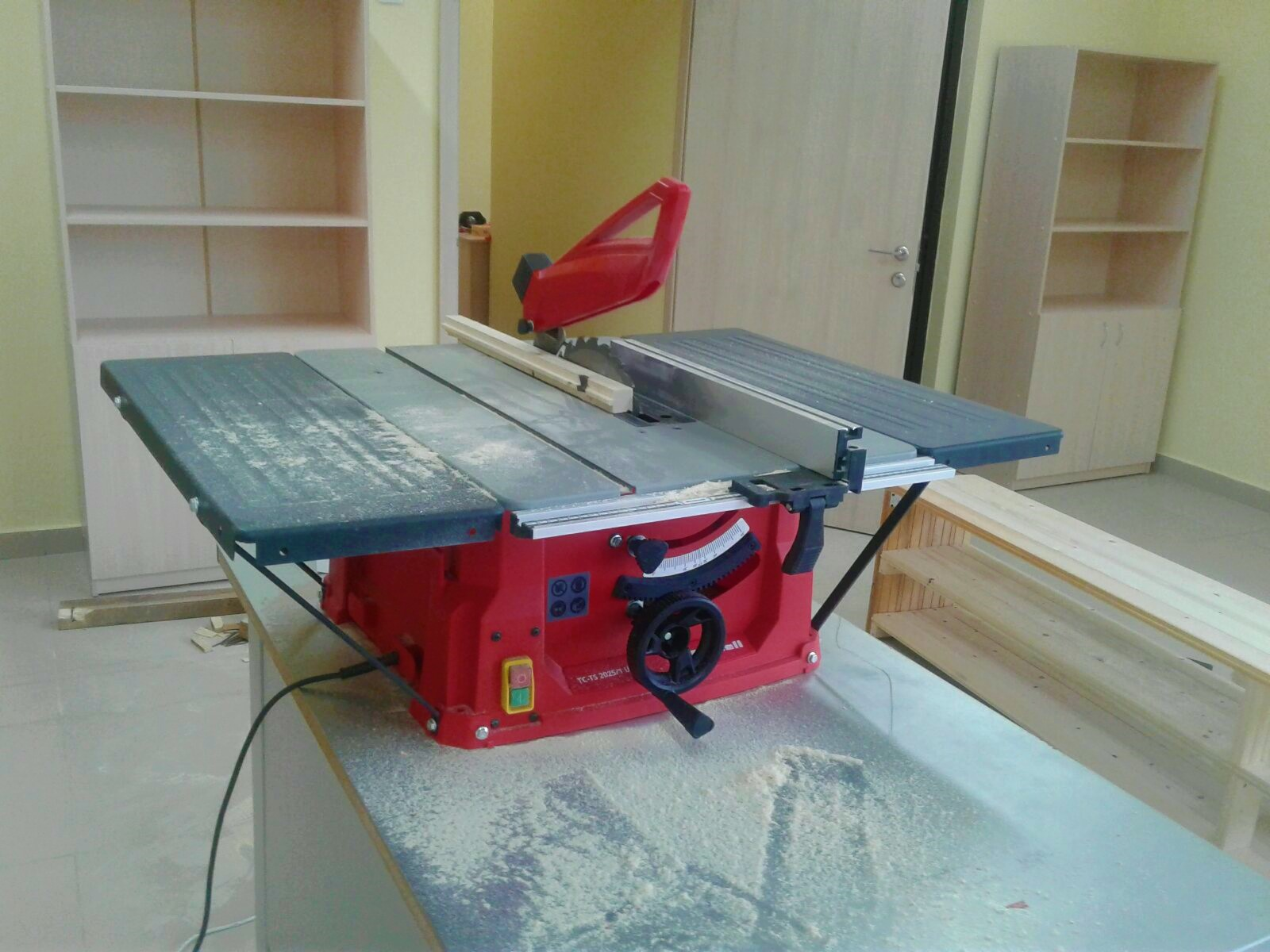
Woodworking table saw in a school workshop.

These machines are used both in small-scale commercial production of timber products and by hobbyists. Most of these machines may be used on solid timber and on composite products. Machines can be divided into the bigger stationary machines where the machine remains stationary while the material is moved over the machine, and hand-held power tools, where the tool is moved over the material.

==== Hand-held power tools ====
- Biscuit joiner
- Domino jointer
- Chain saw
- Hand-held circular saw
- Electric drill
- Jig saw
- Miter saw
- Nail gun
- Hand-held electric plane
- Reciprocating saw
- Rotary tool
- Router
- Grinding machine
- Hand-held sanders, including belt sander, orbital sander, random orbit sander

==== Stationary machines ====
- Bandsaw
- Combination machine
- Double side planer
- Four sided planer or timber sizer
- Drill press
- Drum sander
- Bench grinder
- Jointer
- Wood lathe
- Mortiser
- Panel saw
- Pin router or Overhead Router
- Radial arm saw
- Scroll saw
- Spindle moulder (Wood shaper)
- Stationary sanders, including stroke sanders, oscillating spindle sander, belt sander, disc sander (and combination disc-belt sander).
- Table saw
- Tenoner or tenoning machine
- Thicknesser or Thickness planer
- Round pole milling machine
- Round pole sanding machine

=== Panel Line Woodworking machines ===
These machines are used in large-scale manufacturing of cabinets and other wooden or panel products.

=== Panel surface processing ===
==== Panel dividing equipment ====
Panel dividing equipment, classified by number of beam, loading system, saw carriage speed

==== Double end tenoner ====
Double end tenoner, classified by conveyor type

- Rolling chain system conveyor speed 40 to 120 m/min
- Sliding chain system conveyor speed 10 to 30 m/min

=== Panel edge processing equipment ===
Panel edge processing equipment, classified by conveyor speed

- High speed edgebander conveyor speed >= 100 m/min
- Heavy duty edgebander conveyor speed >= 24 m/min
- Light duty edgebander conveyor speed < 20 m/min (i.e. 8, 12 or 16 m/min)

=== Panel boring equipment ===
classified by number of boring heads

- Single line boring machine
- Multi line boring machine

== See also ==
- List of production topics
