= Smoothing plane =

Woodworking tool used to make a workpiece smooth

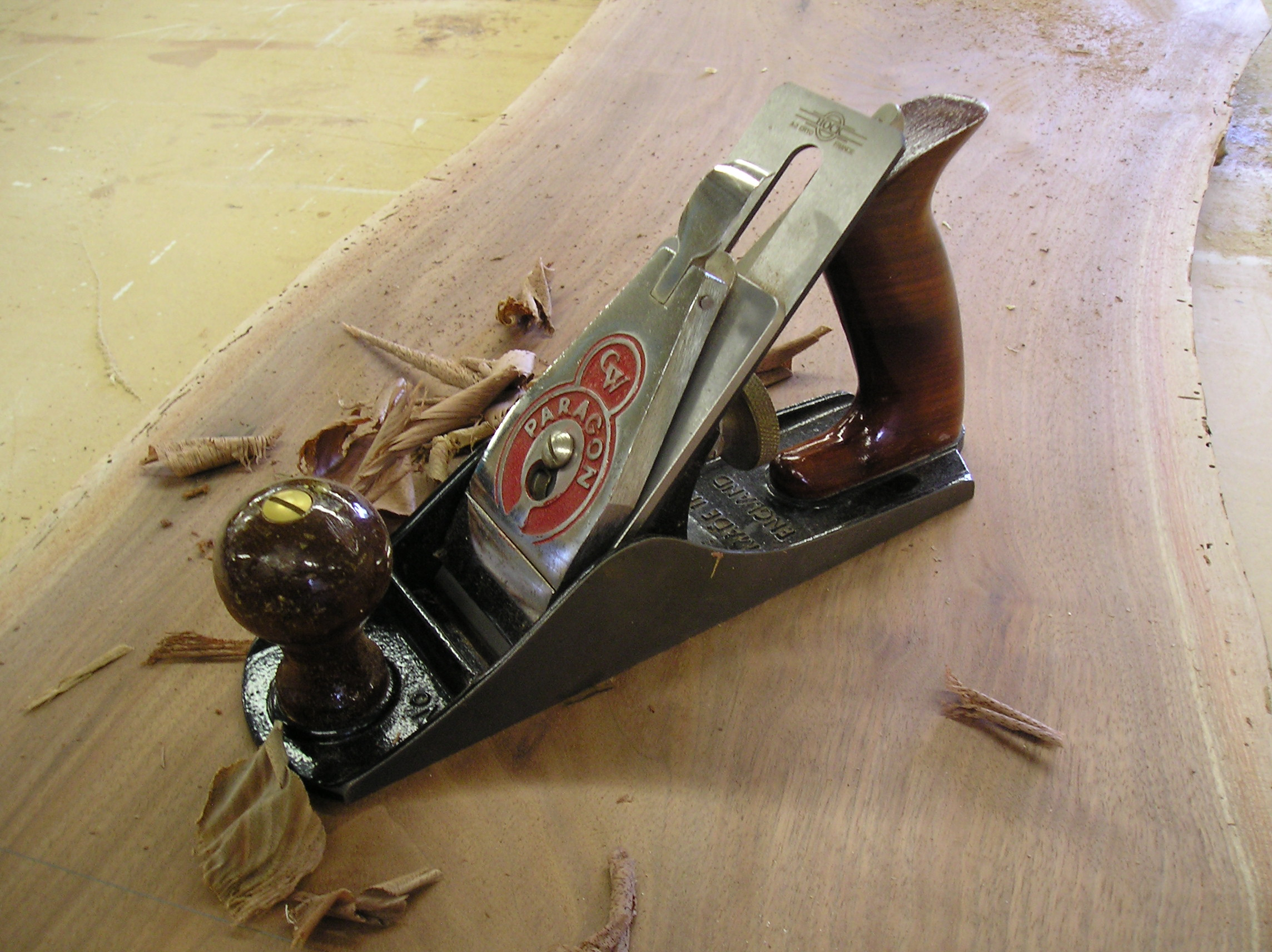
- A Garrett Wade Paragon No. 4 Smoothing Plane
- Other names: Smooth plane Smoother
- Classification: Hand tool
- Types: Metal-bodied; Wooden-bodied; Transitional
- Used with: Jack plane, jointer plane, fore plane, card scraper

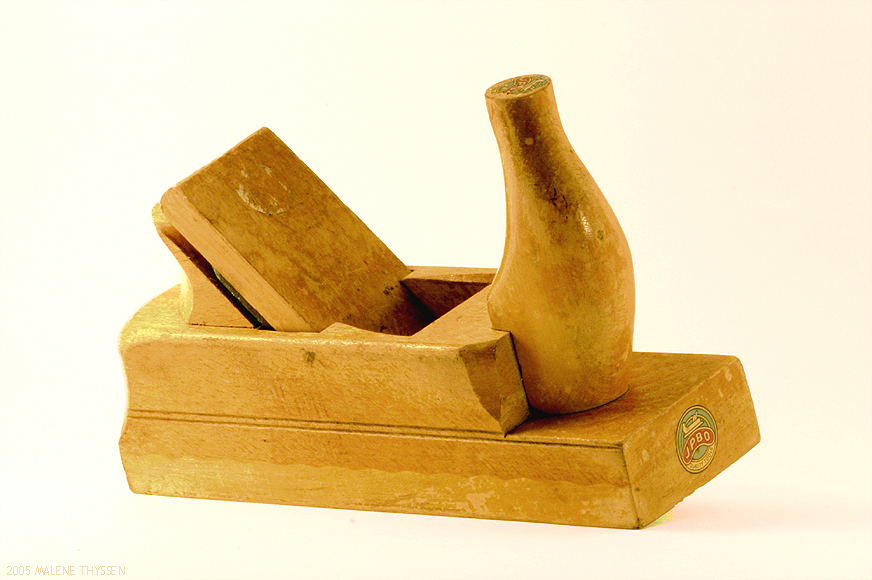
A wooden smoothing plane.

A smoothing plane or smooth plane is a type of bench plane used in woodworking. The smoothing plane is typically the last plane used on a wood surface, removing very fine shavings to leave a smooth finish. When used effectively it quickly produces a finish that equals or surpasses that made by sandpaper.

== Description and history ==
The smoothing plane is the shortest of the bench planes. Under the Stanley Bailey numbering system for metal-bodied planes #1 to #4 are smoothing planes, with lengths ranging from 5 1/2 inches (140 mm) to 10 inches (250 mm). The #4 plane, which is 9 inches (230 mm) in length, is the most common smoothing plane in use. Historically wooden smoothing planes in the United States have typically been 7 to 9 inches (180 to 230 mm) long with irons 1 1/2 to 2 1/2 inches (38 to 64 mm) wide.

As with other bench planes, until the end of the 19th century the bodies of smoothing planes were predominantly wooden, typically made out of beech (Fagus sylvatica in Europe, Fagus grandifolia in North America). Wooden planes were largely superseded by iron-bodied planes and to a lesser extent transitional planes. Despite the predominance of the heavier iron-bodied planes, vintage wooden planes remain in common use, while new wooden smoothing planes are available from a small number of manufacturers.

Being smaller than other bench planes, the smoothing plane is better able to work on smaller workpieces and around obstructions. Since the 1700s wooden smoothing planes have predominantly been 'coffin shaped' – wider in the middle and slightly rounded – making them more manoeuvrable. It has also been claimed that the coffin design exposes more end grain, enabling the plane to better adjust to changes in humidity.

The irons (blades) on smoothing planes are often slightly rounded at the corners to minimise the risk of gouging out tracks or marks in the workpiece, and on a metal plane the throat or mouth is usually set tight to reduce the risk of tearout.

In Britain the name smoothing plane dates back to at least the 17th century.

== Use ==
A smoothing plane is typically used after the workpiece has been flattened and trued by the other bench planes, such as the jack, fore, and jointer planes. Smoothing planes can also be used to remove marks left by woodworking machinery.

When used effectively alongside other bench planes, the smoothing plane should only need a handful of passes removing shavings as fine as 0.002 inches (0.051 mm) or less. The workpiece is then ready to be finished, or can be further refined with a card scraper or sandpaper.

The smoothing plane is usually held with both hands, and used in a similar manner to the other bench planes.

Though designed for smoothing, a smoothing plane can be used as an 'all-round' bench tool and for rougher work depending on how it is set up.
