= Unimat =

The Unimat was a series of combination machines sold for light hobbyist engineering, such as model engineering. They were distinctive as the same major components could be re-arranged into either a lathe or milling machine.

It covers a range of commercially sold machines intended for machining and metalworking for model making hobbyists manufactured by the Emco company. The machines enable the user to have a drill press, lathe and milling machine. Most of the Unimat range is no longer in production, but the smallest Unimat 1 and its variants is now produced by the Cool Tool Gmbh.

== Models ==
=== Original Emco ===
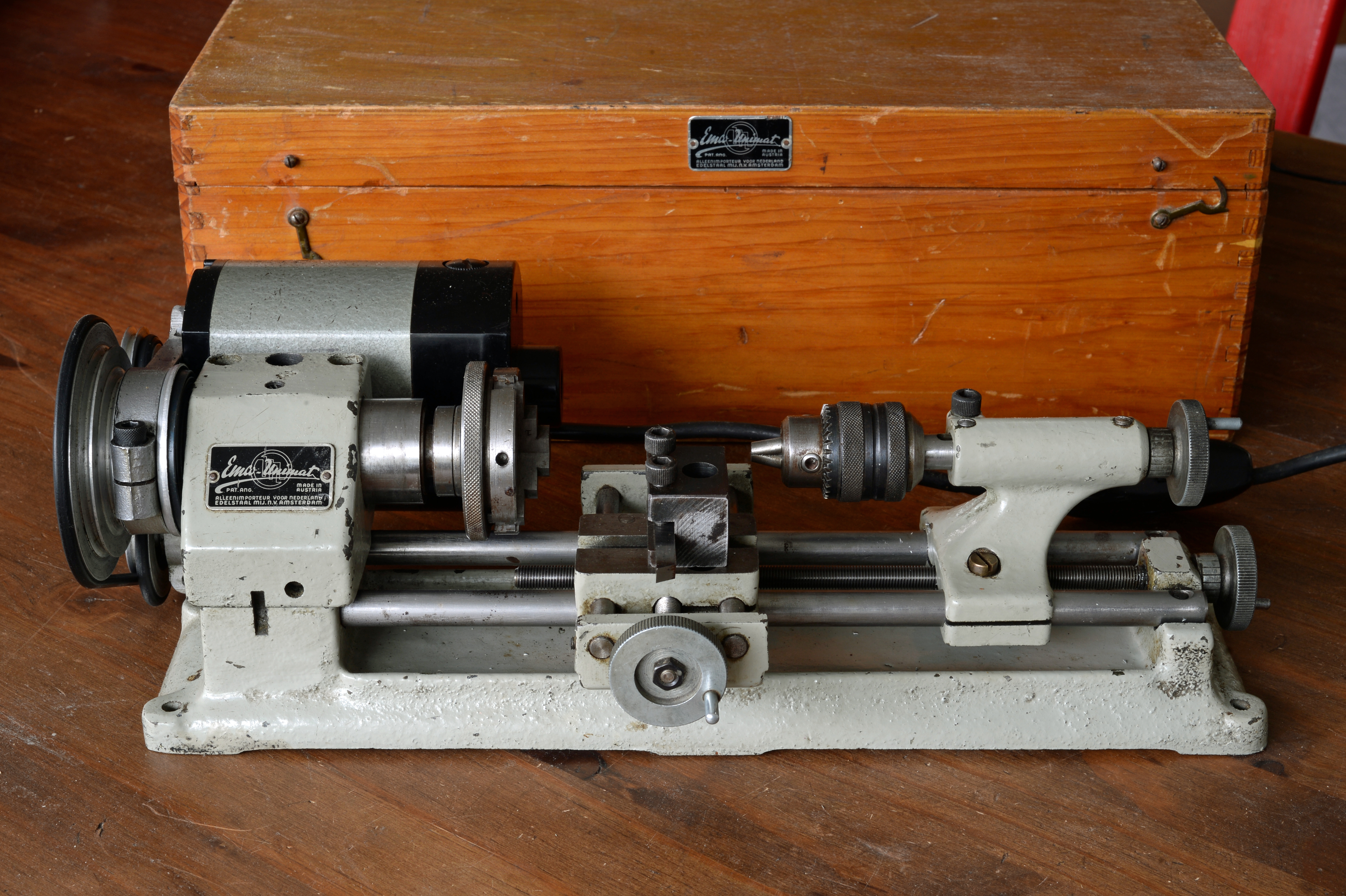
Emco Unimat Metal Lathe (original series)

- Unimat DB, Unimat DB-200
- Unimat SL, Unimat SL-1000
- Unimat 3

=== To Emco Specs ===
- Unimat Basic
- Unimat 4 (lower quality clockmakers/watchmakers lathe with parts interchangeable with the Unimat 3)
- Unimat Compact 5
- Unimat Compact 8E
- Unimat Compact V8
- Maximat F1-P Mill
- Unimat Mill

=== TheCoolTool company ===
- Unimat 1 Basic (model woodworking)

This model of the Unimat 1 has many plastic parts. It is capable of working mostly wood and plastics.

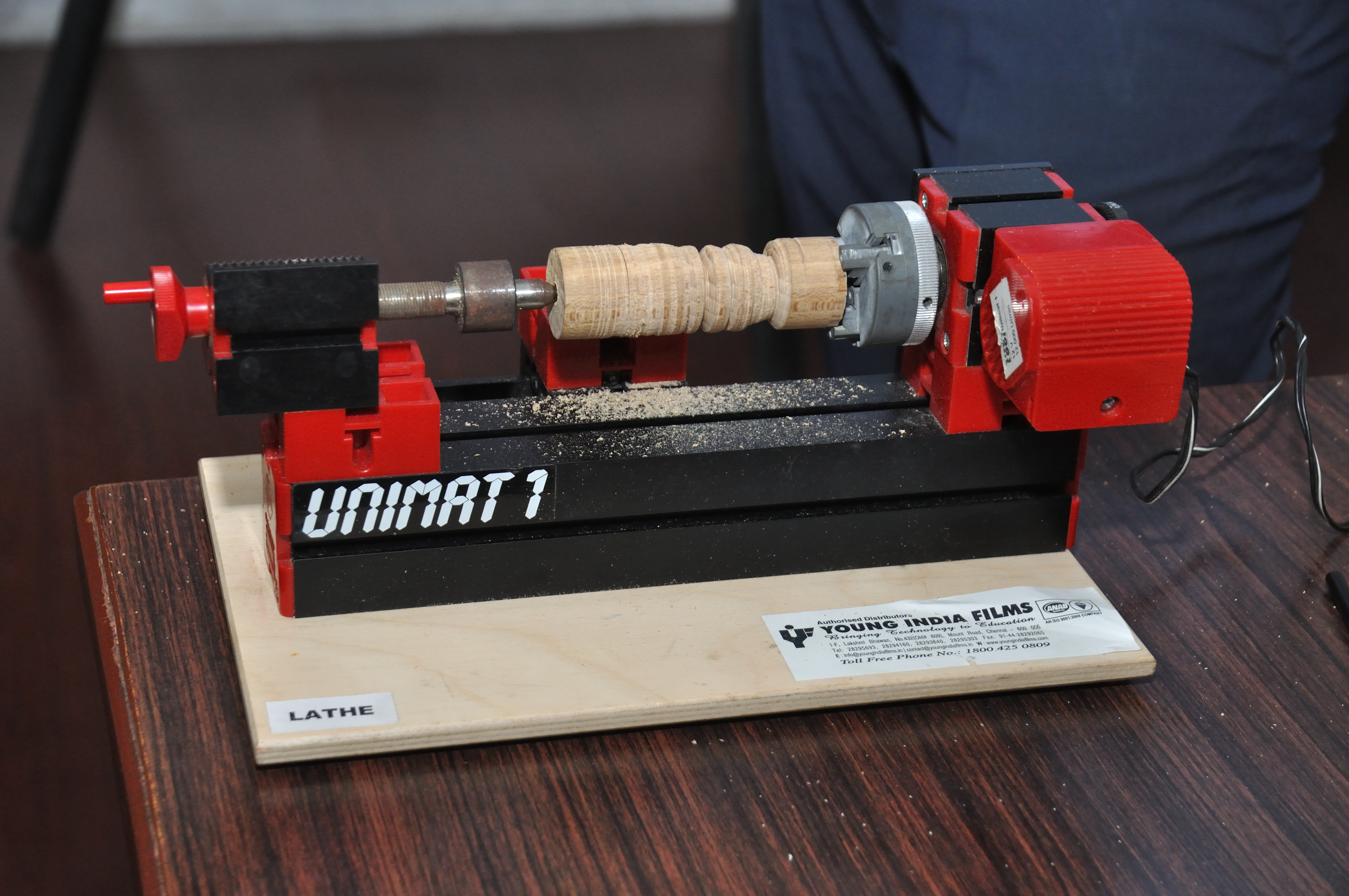
PASCO Unimat 1 Lathe

- Unimat 1 Classic

This model of the Unimat 1 has many plastic parts and plastic machining cross slides. It is capable of working wood, plastic and soft metals i.e. aluminum and brass. It is the same machine as the basic with additional capabilities such as wood turning, sawing, drilling, milling and metal turning.

- Unimat PowerLine

This is a collection of enhancements for any of the Unimat 1 tools. It includes options for more power, table saw and router table.

- Unimat MetalLine

This model of the Unimat 1 has been upgraded to metal parts and cross slides that give the unit a higher level of accuracy. It is capable of working any of the materials from the Basic or Classic versions plus soft steel.

== See also ==
- Metalworking
- Machine shop
