= Edge jointing =

Edge jointing or just jointing is the process of making the edge of a wooden board straight and true in preparation for subsequent operations, often ultimately leading to joining two or more components together. Traditionally, jointing was performed using a jointer plane. Modern techniques include the use of a jointer machine, a hand held router and straight edge, or a table-mounted router.

Although the process derives its name from the primary task of straightening an edge prior to joining, the term jointing is used whenever this process is performed, regardless of the application.

Normally, the desired outcome of jointing is an edge which is straight along its length and perpendicular to the face of the board. However, there is another technique often used when gluing up panels, referred to as a sprung joint. In this technique, the desired outcome is an edge which is slightly concave along its length. When two such edges are brought together and clamped, the sprung edges create greater tension at the ends of the join, which assists in creating a seamless joint.

When using a hand plane to perform this operation, two boards are often clamped face to face in the vice and both jointed at once, creating two edges that are mirror images of one another. This method ensures that even if the edges are not perfectly perpendicular to their respective faces, when the two board edges are brought together, the result is a flat panel because the error in each edge cancels the other out.
