= Jointer plane =

Large woodworking hand plane used for flattening and jointing workpieces

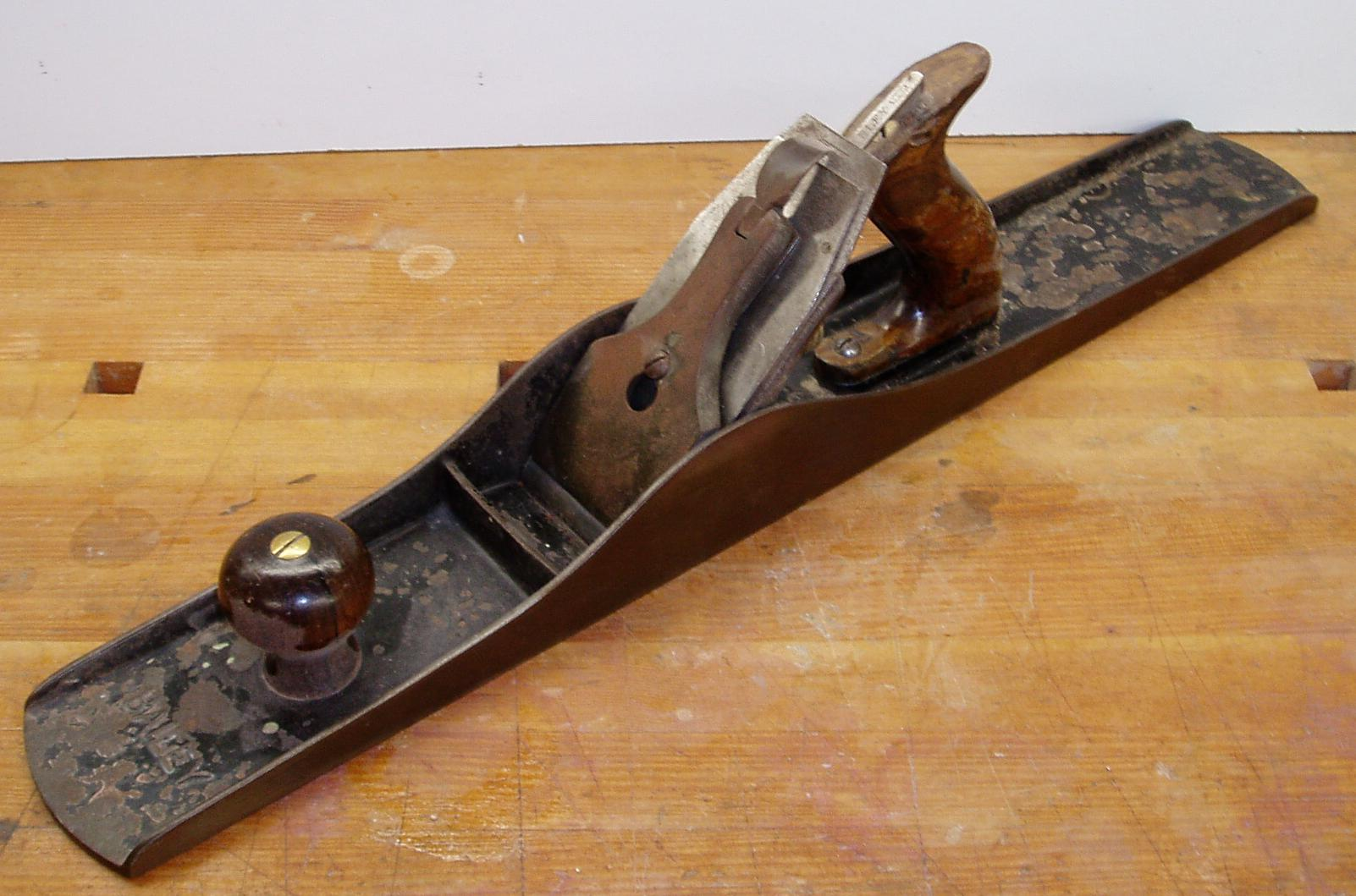
- A Stanley #7 jointer plane

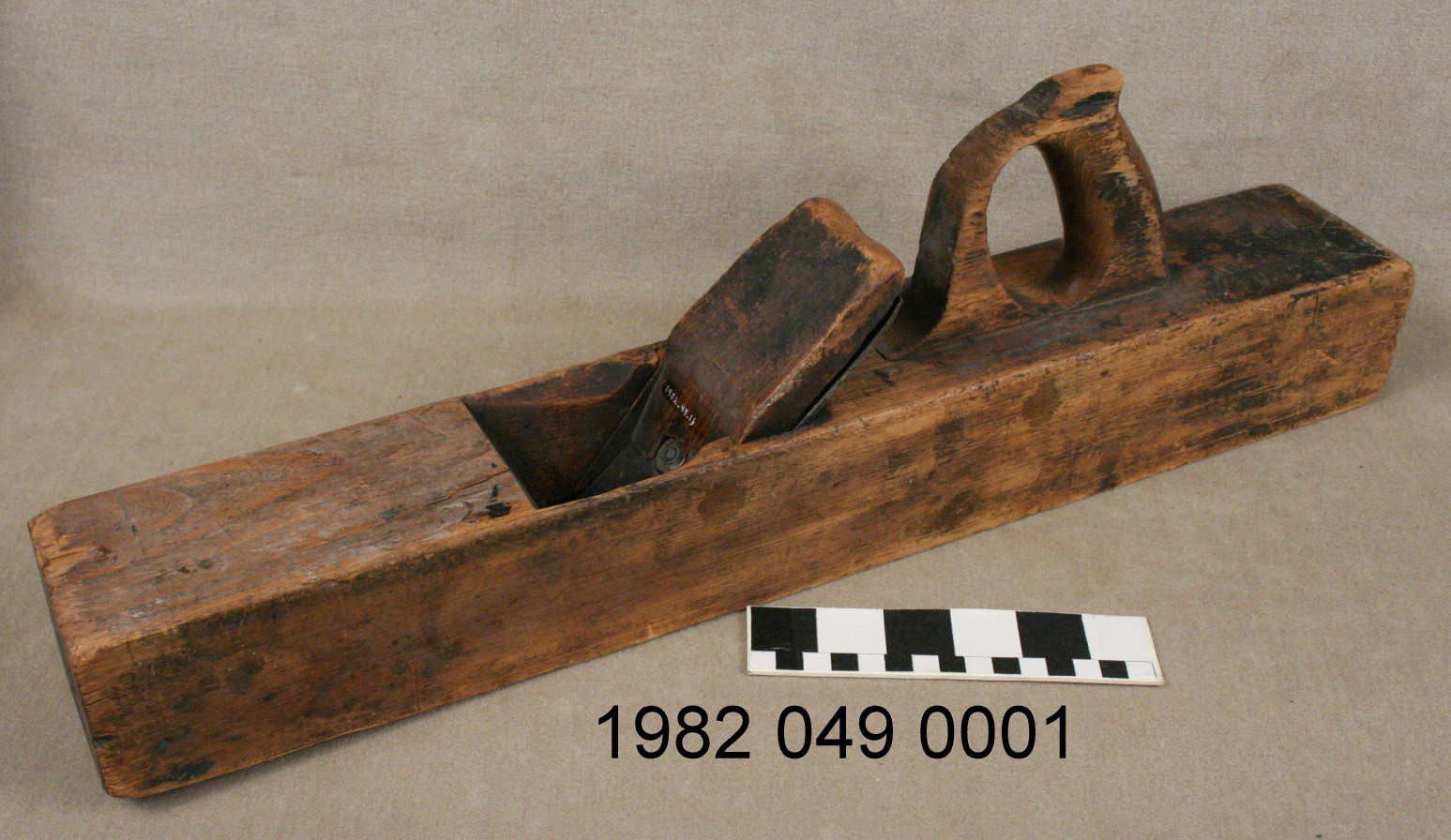
- Wooden jointer from c.1880
- Other names: Try plane Trying plane Trueing plane
- Used with: Jack plane and smoothing plane

The jointer plane, also known as the try plane or trying plane, is a type of hand plane used in woodworking to straighten the edges of boards in the process known as jointing, and to flatten the faces of larger boards. Its long length is designed to 'ride over' the undulations of an uneven surface, skimming off the peaks, gradually creating a flatter surface. In thicknessing or preparing rough stock, the jointer plane is usually preceded by the fore plane or jack plane and followed by the smoothing plane.

Jointer planes are typically 20 to 24 inches (510 to 610 mm) long, and are the longest hand planes commonly used. Under the Stanley Bailey numbering system, #7 and #8 planes are jointer planes.

The use of the name jointer plane dates back to at least the 17th century, referring to the process of readying the edges of boards for jointing. The terms try plane, trying plane, and trueing plane have been in use since at least the 19th century.

As with other hand planes, jointer planes were originally made with wooden bodies. But, since the development of the metal-bodied hand plane at the end of the 19th century, wooden-bodied jointers have been largely superseded. Metal-bodied planes are heavier, which is particularly noticeable for planes as large as jointers. This can make metal-bodied jointers more tiring to use for extended periods of time.

== See also ==
- Jointer
