= Boring machine (carpentry) =

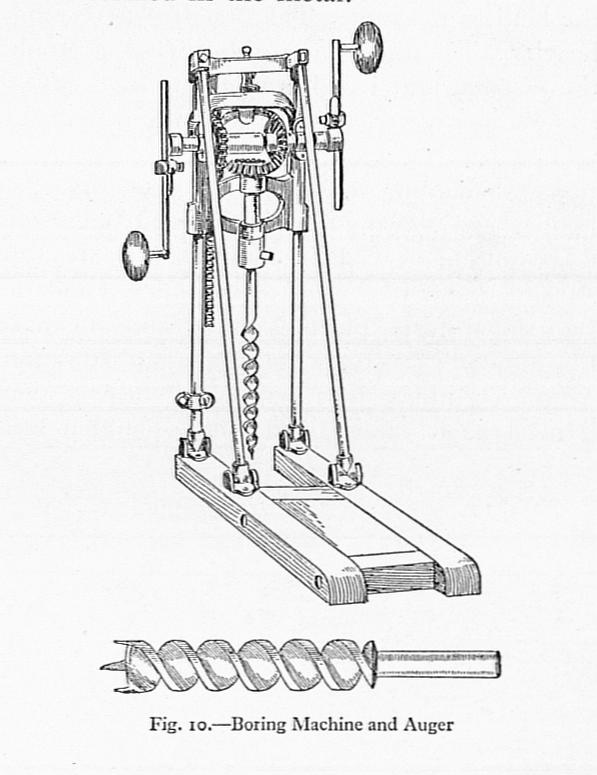
Hand boring machine (Carpentry and Joinery Magazine, 1925)

A carpenters boring machine is a hand-driven machine to bore holes in beams such in the process of making a mortise or making holes for the wooden pegs which hold mortise and tenon joints together.

== History ==
Before boring machines were invented, carpenters used hand-powered augers to bore holes. Most common were T-handled augers. The shape of the drill bits changed over time, with the spoon bit and shell bit being common before the invention of the spiral or twist bit in 1771 which removes the cuttings as it turns. The exact origin of this invention is not known, but the earliest patent is in the United States in 1830 by J. Beckwith and was as tall as a man and operated by a large wheel from the side.

Boring machines use twist auger bits usually ranging in size from 7/8 inch to 2 inches. The machines hold the bit perpendicular (square) to the face of the timber and are operated with both hands while the operator sits on the base to keep the machine from moving. Some machines can be set at an angle.

American manufacturers included “…Boss, Ajax, Snell Manufacturing Co., Sweet, Jennings, Saunders, R. Ball & co., Roswell Buck, Phillips, Millers Falls, Riley Smith, James Oppenheimer, and the Square Hole Auger Company. Some companies made 10 or 12 different models…”.

== Decline in use ==
Traditional timber framing in North America went into a slow decline after the invention and spread of balloon framing (1832) and what was called plank framing in barn construction in the mid-to-late 19th century. Combined with electrification of hand-held tool carpenters, boring machines became obsolete.
