= Thickness planer =

Type of machinery used in woodworking

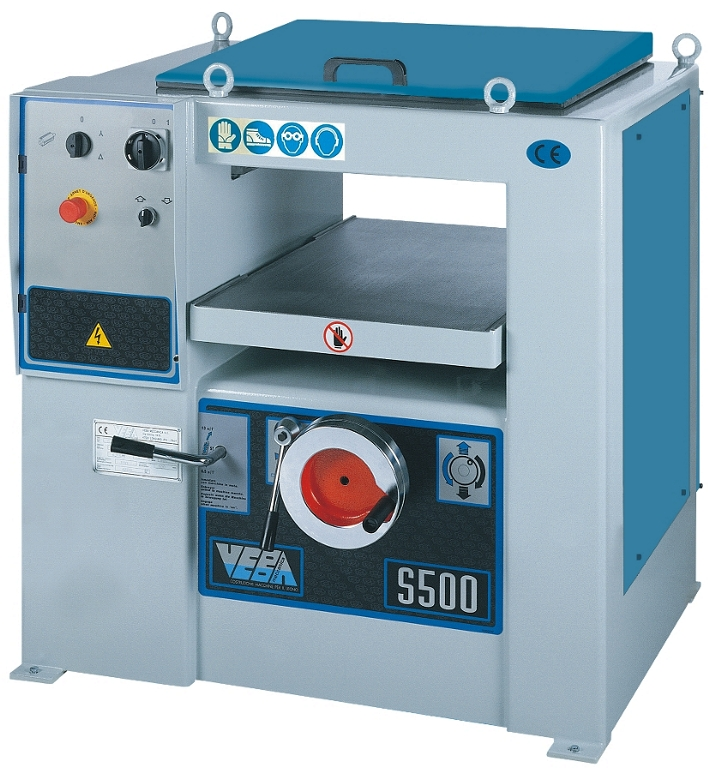
Thickness planer

A thickness planer (also known in the UK and Australia as a thicknesser or in North America as a planer) is a woodworking machine used to plane boards to a consistent thickness throughout their length, with two parallel faces. This machine transcribes the desired thickness using the downside as a reference / index. So, to produce a completely flat, planed board requires that the down surface is flat before planing. Obtaining the first flat side requires face jointing with a either a jointer or hand plane; or face planing using a planer and jointer sled.

== Function ==
A thickness planer is a woodworking machine to trim boards to a consistent thickness throughout their length and flat on both surfaces.

It is different from a surface planer, or jointer, where the cutter head is set between two bed surfaces of differing heights. A surface planer is used to create a first flat surface. The thickness planer (USA) or thicknesser (UK) produce a board with a consistent thickness, as long as the board has one flat face to use as the reference for the face being milled parallel to the first.

== Design ==
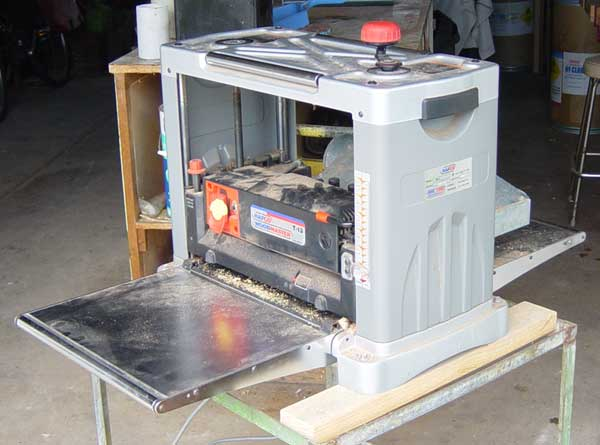
A portable thickness planer

A thickness planer consists of three elements: a cutter head which contains the cutting knives; a set of rollers which draw the board through the machine; and a table which is adjustable relative to the cutter head to control the resultant thickness of the board. Some portable thickness planers differ slightly in that the table is fixed and the cutter head/feed roller assembly is adjusted.

Industrial thickness planers are capable of accepting wider boards and removing larger amounts of material in a single pass. These machines are driven by powerful motors and are of very heavy construction. Lightweight portable thickness planers are available that use less expensive, but noisy, universal motors rather than induction motors and are therefore less expensive than industrial versions.

The jointer and thickness planer are available combined into a single combination machine, a jointer-planer. In the U.K. this is called a planer–thicknesser or over–and–under.

== Operation ==
How a thickness planer works.

In operation, the table is set to the desired height and then the machine is switched on. The board is fed into the machine until it makes contact with the in-feed roller which grips the board and draws it into the machine and past the rotating cutter head. The knives remove material on the way through and the out-feed roller pulls the board through and directs it from the machine at the end of the pass.

To create a board that is flat and of uniform thickness along its length, it is necessary to start with a board that has at least one perfectly flat reference face. The board is fed with this reference face flat on the table and the cutter head removes an amount of material from the opposite face so that it is made parallel to the reference face. The reference face is often created by first passing the board over a jointer. If the lower face is not flat, the feed roller pressure pressing the board against the table will deform the board, which will then spring back as it leaves the machine, resulting in a non-flat upper surface.

One problem often encountered when using a thickness planer is snipe. This manifests as a deeper cut on a short section of the board at either end and is caused by incorrect feeding or misalignment of the in-feed or out-feed tables, or an unnecessarily high setting of the rollers recessed in the surface of the in-feed table. It can be accommodated by keeping the board overlong to allow later trimming.

== See also ==
- Planing mill
- A very general guide on Thickness Planer from DECD
