= Panel saw =

Type of sawing machine

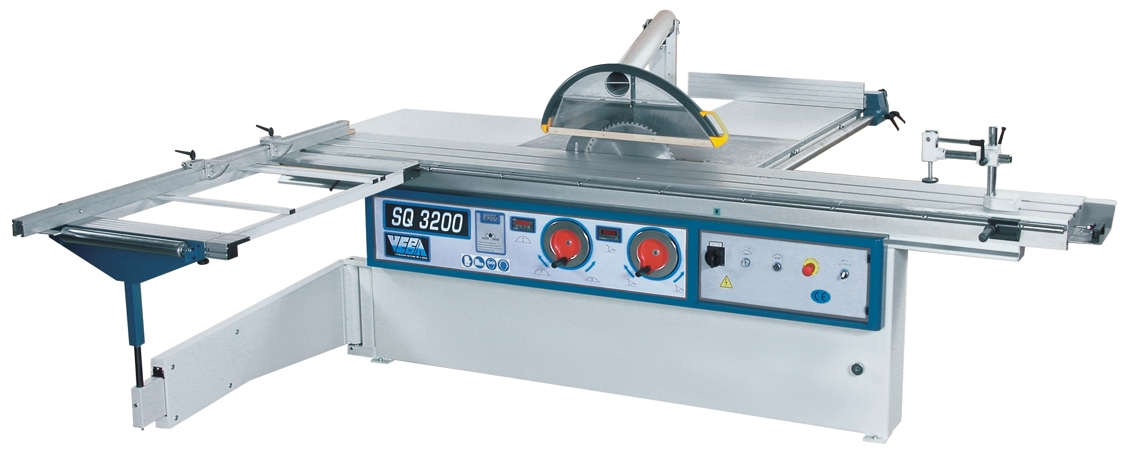
Manual horizontal panel saw

A panel saw is any type of sawing machine that cuts sheets into sized parts.

== Types ==
Panel saws can be vertical or horizontal. Typically, vertical saws take up less floor space.

Horizontal machines are typically large table saws with a sliding feed table that pushes the material through the blade. Table saws without the sliding feed table can also cut sheet goods.

Vertical saws have two cost types, low cost and higher cost. Both types have the saw traveling through the short side of the sheet called cross cutting. For cutting lengthwise (rip) cut, the lower cost models, have the user slide the material through the saw while the higher cost models have the saw travel through the stationary material.

== History ==
A sliding panel saw was invented by Wilhelm Altendorf in 1906 in Germany. Its invention set a new standard in woodworking, with dramatic differences from traditional machines. Up to that time, a conventional table saw had no mechanism for edging, meaning that for the first and second longitudinal cut on untreated massive wood, the lumber always had to be fed manually through the saw blade. The new system accomplished the task more elegantly by allowing the work piece to be fed through the saw blade while lying on a sliding table. Thus cutting becomes faster, accurate and effortless.

Panel saws are used by cabinet shops to easily cut panels, profiles, solid wood, plywood, MDF, laminates, plastic sheets and melamine sheets into sizes or cabinet components. They are also used by sign shops to cut sheets of aluminum, plastic and wood for their sign blanks. Some higher end panel saws feature computer controls that move the blade and fence systems to preset values. Other lower end machines offer simplicity and ease of use, including full scale hobbyist level panel saws at a mere fraction of the cost. While the entry level machines are designed for light duty usage, they offer home DIYers a cheap alternative for infrequent cutting when accuracy and clean cuts are not required.

Panel saws can have one main saw blade, or a scoring along with a main saw blade. Scoring is used to create a groove, especially in double side laminate before the main saw rips the piece in two, to avoid chipping. The scoring saw rotates in an opposite direction, as the main saw to avoid chipping.
