= Garrett Wade =

American manufacturer of hand tools

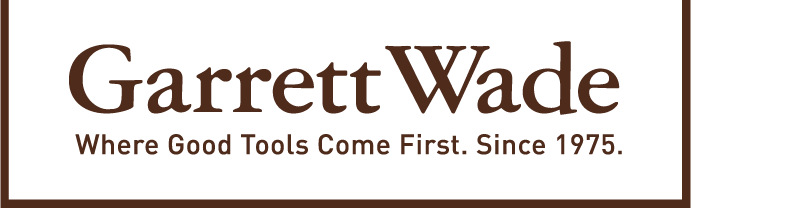
- Company type: Private
- Industry: Hand tools
- Founded: 1975; 51 years ago
- Founder: Garretson Wade Chinn
- Website: garrettwade.com

Garrett Wade is a family-owned business, established in 1975 and based in DUMBO, Brooklyn and Cincinnati, Ohio. It sources and sells a range of high quality hand tools, primarily for woodworking, gardening, and outdoor work, based on traditional designs. It is best known for its tools used for woodworking. Garry Chinn is the founder and CEO of Garrett Wade.

== History ==
In the spring of 1975, Garretson Wade Chinn mailed the first Garrett Wade catalog. It contained primarily woodworking tools sourced from around the world, with particular focus on Europe. The goal of the catalog, along with media like Fine Woodworking Magazine, was to reconnect men to the experience of using their hands, as they had done in shop class as boys. In 1995, responding to decreasing demand for woodworking tools, the company expanded its product line to hand tools for homeowners, with particular focus on gardening and outdoor tools. Recently, Garrett Wade also began researching, developing and manufacturing tools in-house.

Garrett Wade was involved in the early success of other woodworking companies such as Lie Nielsen Toolworks and Lee Valley.

Today, Garrett Wade products compete with mass-produced tools from companies such as Stanley and Craftsman. Some of their tools are unique. They have sales of more than $10 million (USD) a year and approximately 220,000 customers. The company continues to publish a catalog but has also developed a substantial online business.
