= Combination machine =

A combination machine is a woodworking machine that combines the functions of two or more separate machines into a single unit. For example, a combination machine might consist of a tablesaw with a side-mounted jointer. Another common example of this type of machine is the jointer-thicknesser (also known as an over-under) which combines the function of a jointer with that of a planer.

== Design ==
Some combination machines run all of their functions from a single motor; others may use more than one. Cutter heads are often shared: for example a jointer-thicknesser may use the same cutter head for both functions. The machines rely upon well thought-out designs which allow the user to switch from one function to another easily.

== Advantages ==
One rationale for the production of these machines is space saving. A combination machine takes up much less space than the equivalent separate machines. Most European machines have a sliding table that tends to make them safer than typical North American table saws. Even though top end combination machines can be quite expensive, there usually is a cost saving over separate machines of similar quality.

== Disadvantages ==
There are some trade offs with combination machines. Set up time is increased when moving from one function to another and back. In some cases, machine settings are lost during the change over and have to be re-established when changing back. In some lower end machines, there may be compromises in design which limit the function or robustness of the machine. Finally, they represent a single point of failure in that a mechanical problem with the machine will generally mean that none of the machine's functions are available.

These disadvantages are offset by the small size of the machine footprint and potential cost saving and so they are very popular with hobbyists and workshops in which space is limited.

== The Shopsmith ==
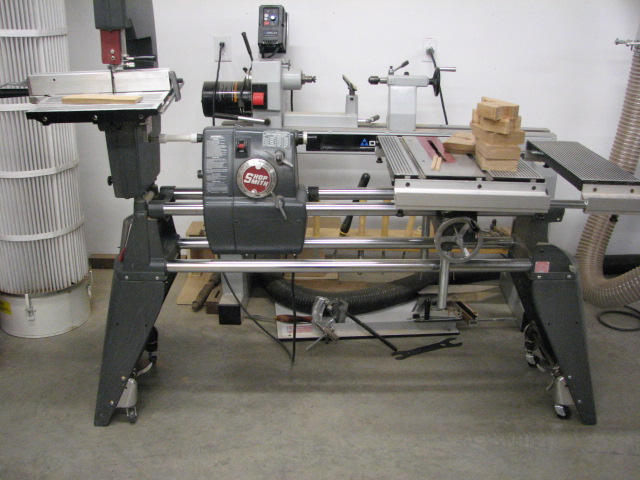
Shopsmith Mark V

The Shopsmith is a lathe-based multi-tool that uses a single motor to perform lathe, tablesaw, sanding, and drill press functions. Variations include horizontal boring and disc sander.

The original Shopsmith 10E and 10ER were invented by Dr. Hans Goldschmidt of Albany, CA, in 1947; made by the Magna America Corporation in Berkeley, CA, from 1947 to 1953; and sold by Montgomery Ward. The Mark 5 debuted in 1953 but went out of production in 1964. The earliest 10E/10ER Shopsmith machines could be accompanied by optional add-ons such as a jointer, a jig saw, as well as smaller accessories allowing use as a shaper. A bandsaw was introduced in 1957 for the Mark series of machines. Magna also made the Sawsmith radial arm saw, the Mark 2 (1958-60) and the short-lived Mark VII, all compatible with the Mark V accessories. The Shopsmith Mark V was resurrected by Shopsmith Inc. in 1972 in Dayton, OH, by John Folkerth, founder and first chairman of the company. As of 2014 the machines were manufactured by RLF Brands, successor to Shopsmith Inc..

RLF Brands continues to manufacture and market a variety of add-on tools that can be run by the headstock. These tools include a bandsaw (little changed from the original 1957 version), wood shaper, jointer, belt sander, strip sander, scroll saw and thickness planer. Changes from one function to the other is usually less than 90 seconds.

One of the unique features of the Shopsmith is its method of speed control. Rather than multiple pairs of pulleys or an electronic speed control, the Mark V uses a Reeves-type continuously variable transmission consisting of two variable diameter pulleys controlled by a dial and worm gear. (Standard on the Mark V, this system was optionally available on the early 10ER machines.) Not only does this give theoretically infinite speed variation between the maximum and minimum speeds, it is also simple enough to be serviced fairly easily by a hobbyist. The new (as of 2010) Shopsmith Mark 7 uses a computer-controlled motor that offers more power, greater speed range, reversibility and easy conversion to 220 V. An injury suffered by the user of a Shopsmith gave the Supreme Court of California the opportunity to create the modern rule of strict liability for defective products in 1963.

== European combination machine ==
Several companies in Austria, Italy, France and Belgium manufacture what is commonly known in North America as a Euro(pean) combination machine, which typically contains a sliding-table saw with a scoring blade, a shaper, a thicknesser, a jointer, and a mortiser. These machines generally have three motors, one for the table saw, one for the shaper, and one shared by the thickness planer/jointer and mortiser.

European combination machines are geared for the serious hobbyist or professional woodworker or cabinet maker. They are constructed of cast iron and heavy gauge steel, weigh from 1,000 to 2,000 pounds (450–910 kg), and range in price from around $5,000 to over $30,000 (2010, U.S. dollars).

Manufacturers include Felder (Felder and Hammer brands), Kitty, Knapp, Lurem, Mini-Max, Robland, Rojek, Veba and others. Rojek and Robland manufacture entry-level models, Hammer, Lurem, MiniMax and Veba mid-range models, Felder and Knapp high-end models. Robland purchased Knapp from the Metabo group in 2000.

The European combination machine allows efficient processing of both rough-cut timber and sheet stock (i.e. plywood). The sliding table can work in conjunction with either the table saw or the shaper. Outfitted with an 8-foot (2.4 m) sliding table and outrigger, a single person can cut 4-by-8-foot (1.2 m × 2.4 m) plywood very accurately and efficiently. Changing between most functions takes only a few seconds.

The sliding table allows a straight edge to be cut on rough lumber, without the use of a fence. It also allows a cut to be made accurately at any angle across a sheet of plywood in just seconds – something that cannot be done nearly as easily, if at all, on a table saw. Used in conjunction with the shaper, the sliding table allows molding, door panels, rails and stiles, to be milled quickly and more accurately than a stand-alone shaper.

== Photographic gallery ==
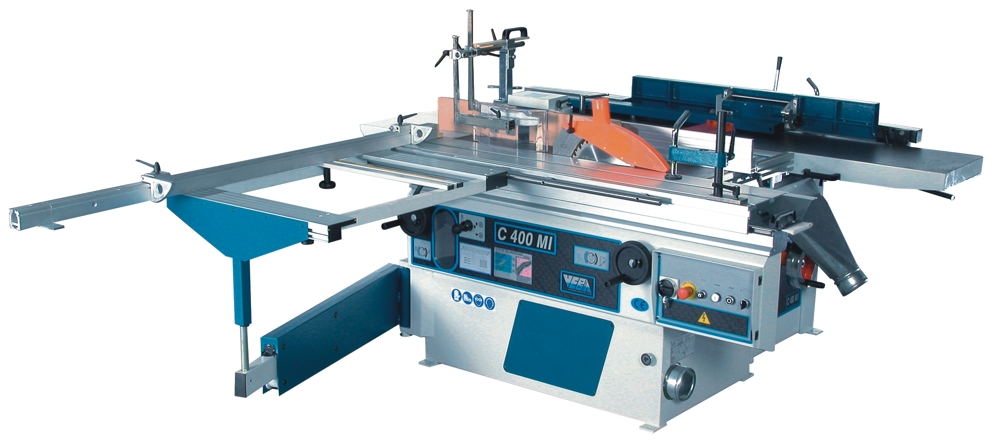
Universal combined woodworking machine
