= Jointer =

Woodworking machine

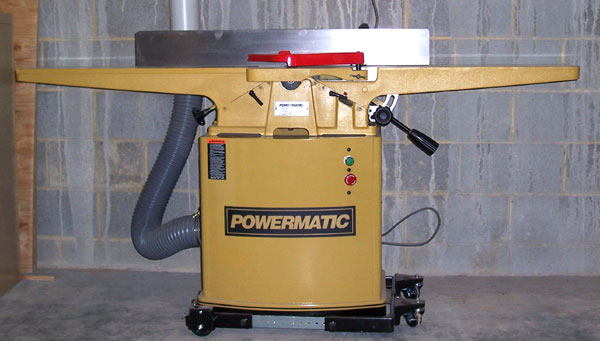
High end or professional grade jointer-planer discernible by the integral vacuum reservoir, metal blade guard, and the very long infeed and outfeed tables. The moderately wide (4-8 inches, 10-20 centimeters) tables make it suitable for single side power planing operations.

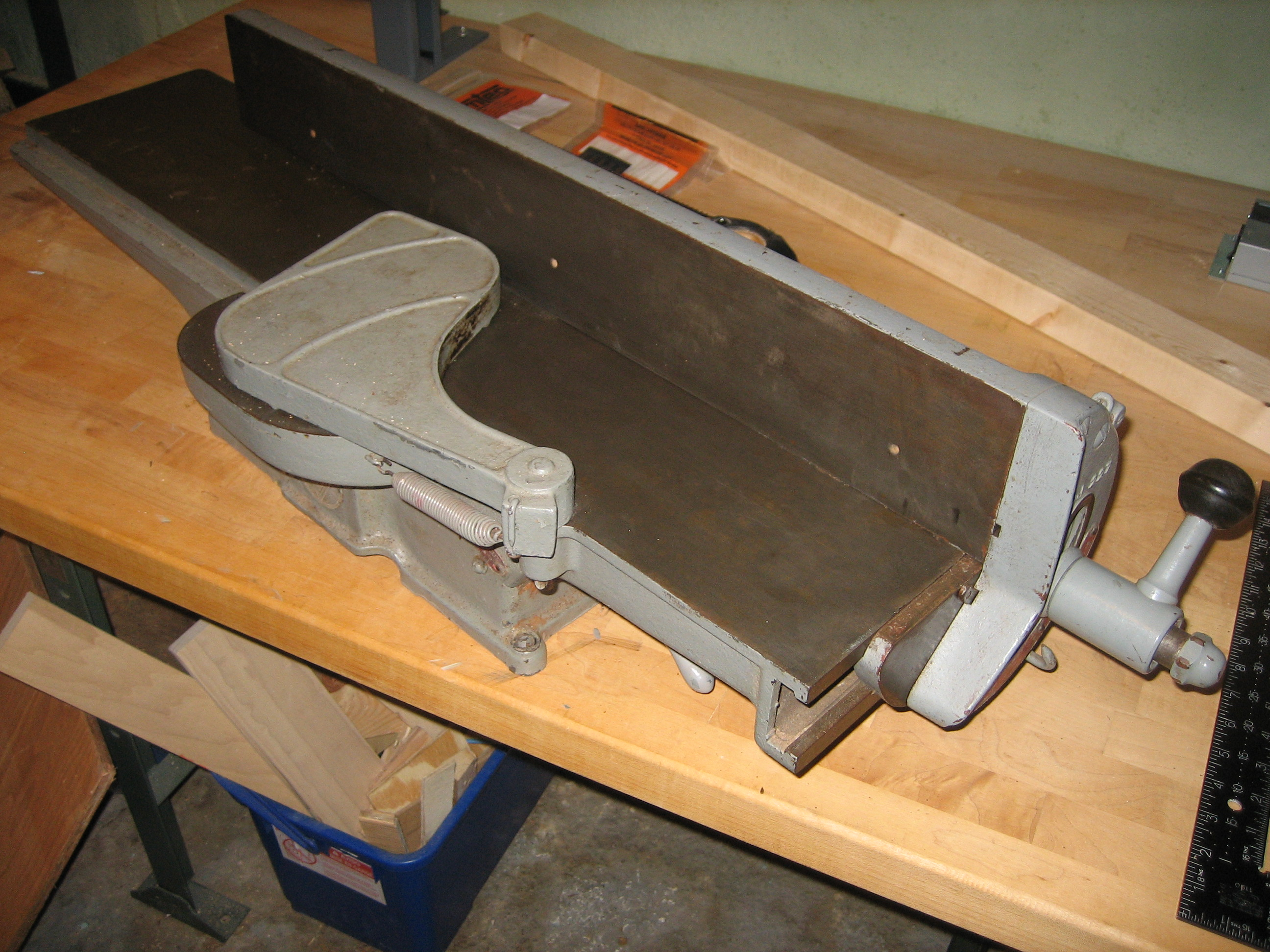
Bench top jointer. Has shorter feed tables, though the width of this model makes it a useful short work piece surface planer.

How a jointer works. Notice the Infeed and outfeed table heights relative to the high speed rotating cutting blades.

A jointer or in some configurations, a jointer-planer (also known in the UK and Australia as a planer or surface planer, and sometimes also as a buzzer or flat top) is a woodworking machine used to produce a flat surface along a board's length. As a jointer, the machine operates on the narrow edge of boards, preparing them for use in a butt joint often used to glue boards into panels. A planer-jointer setup has the width that enables smoothing ('surface planing') and leveling the faces (widths) of boards small enough to fit the width of the tables and blades.

== Name ==
The jointer derives its name from its primary function of producing flat edges on boards prior to joining them edge-to-edge to produce wider boards. The use of this term probably arises from the name of a type of hand plane, the jointer plane, which is also used primarily for this purpose.

"Planer" is the name in the UK and Australia for what is called a "jointer" in North America, where the former term refers exclusively to a thickness planer.

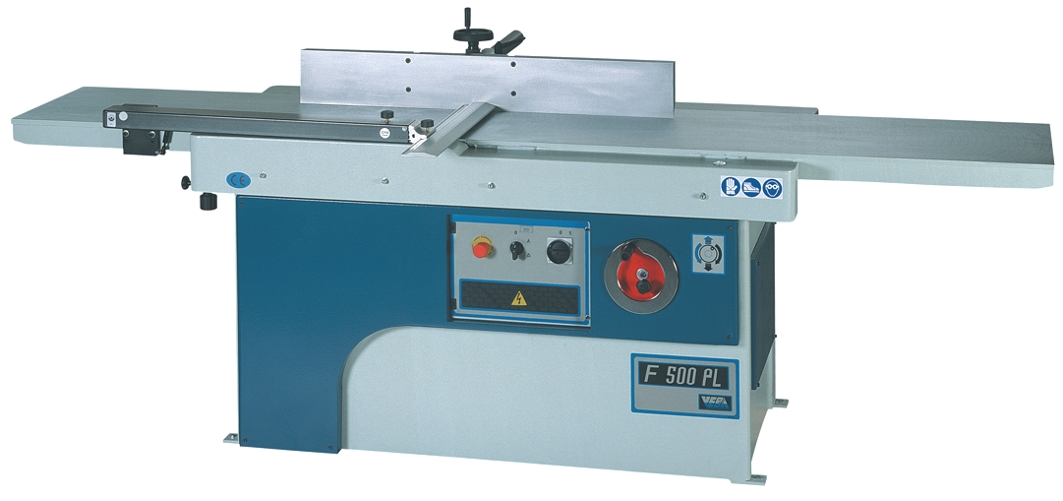
Italian surface planer or jointer-planer with a pair of large tables.

== Design ==
Fundamentally, a jointer's table arrangement is designed with two levels like a narrower thickness planer so that it consists of two long, parallel tables in sequence with a cutter head recessed between them. To the side of the tables is a fence. The fence angle to the tables is adjustable, but most often used at 90 degrees to the tables. This cutter head is typically driven by an electric induction motor. (Older machines were driven by belts from line shafts.)

The tables are referred to as the infeed table (the table before the blades, on which the board is fed, that sits lower than the blades) and the outfeed table (the table referenced to the height of the blades, on which the work piece sits after milling by the machine's cutting head. The work piece to be jointed is placed on the infeed table and passed over the cutter head, then to the outfeed table, with care taken to maintain a constant feed speed and downward pressure.

The traditional jointer cutter head contains two or more knives which are honed to a very sharp edge. The knives are arranged radially in a cylindrical cutter head such that their cutting edges protrude an equal amount from the cutter head in order to contact the board being jointed as the cutter head spins. The cutter head's axis of rotation is parallel to the table surfaces and perpendicular to the feed direction. The knives cut into the board in the direction opposite to the feed.

Modern jointer models may contain a spiral, or helical, cutting head. This configuration has many individually mounted, self-indexing knives with 4 sharp sides, that can be rotated to a new edge when necessary. Rarely, older models have cutter heads that are not cylindrical but instead square. This leaves a significantly larger open region below the level of the blade edges and creates a larger hazard as hands and fingers can be pulled in further and cut more deeply.

The infeed and outfeed tables can be raised or lowered independently of each other and in relation to the cutter head although the outfeed table is normally set so that it is level with the knives when at the top dead centre of the rotation of the cutter head. The infeed table is adjusted so that it is lower than the outfeed table and this adjusts the depth of cut.

Jointers for home workshops usually have a 4–8 inch (approximately 100–200mm) width of cut. Larger machines, often 12-16 inches (approximately 300–400mm), are used in industrial settings.

== Operation ==
In operation, the board to be jointed is held with its face against the fence and the edge to be jointed resting on the infeed table. The board is fed across the cutter head and onto the outfeed table. The knives in the revolving cutter head remove an amount of material and the relationship of the two tables and the fence keeps the board oriented in such a way that the result is an edge which is flat along its length and perpendicular to the board's face.

A jointer may also be used to flatten the face of a board, in which case the sole focus is to produce a flat surface on the face of the board and the fence is not used. This procedure is often performed prior to edge jointing so that the board has a flat reference face for subsequent operations.

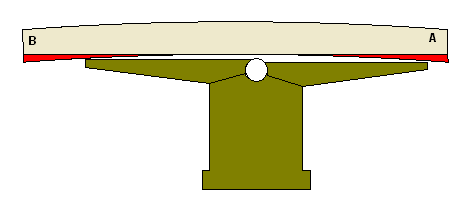
Straightening 'crown', the curved edge of a bowed board: Straightening is a successive approximation sequence. Successive cuts are made from each end, made successively longer each time the board is turned end for end. After the crown is straightened, the work piece would next be taken to a table saw for a cut to make a new parallel edge—which then will likely be smoothed by another run through the jointer.

To straighten a piece of bowed timber, the guard is temporarily swung out of the way. The machine is switched on and the timber is slowly lowered to the machine table, with the concave side down. A few cuts are made out of the red section "A". The timber is turned end for end and the same procedure is done to the section "B". This is repeated as required with the operator sighting along the length of the timber from time to time to check on straightness of the timber. When the timber is almost straight, the guard is replaced and the last cut is made in the normal way.

Twisted material is treated in a similar way. The operator lays the timber on the bed of the machine and rocks it slowly from side to side to estimate the amount of twist. If there is, say, 20mm of twist in the board, he holds the board level and takes 10mm off one end, then repeats it for the other end.

Jointers are also used for making rebates (also known as rabbets in North America) in finished timber. The fence is set to the width of the rebate and the infeed table is set to the depth. A jointer that is used for rebating has the outside ends of its blades also sharpened and set with a small clearance from the cutter head.

A jointer cannot be used to create a board of even thickness along its length. For this task, after jointing one face, a thickness planer is used.

Thickness planers and jointers are often combined into one machine, with the work piece passing underneath the same rotating blade for thicknessing, but in the opposite direction. In the US this is called a planer–thicknesser or over-and-under.

== Safety ==
Jointers are widely regarded as one of the more hazardous stationary woodworking machines due to the exposed, high-speed rotating cutter head. Safety guidance from woodworking organizations emphasizes maintaining functional cutterhead guards, using push blocks to keep hands clear of the knives, and limiting depth of cut to reduce the risk of kickback and loss of control.

Operators are generally advised to avoid jointing stock that is excessively short or thin, to take multiple shallow passes rather than deep single cuts, and to maintain proper stance and controlled feed rates. Continuous attention during operation is emphasized, as repetitive use can lead to operator inattention and increased accident risk. Round pieces of wood should not be flattened with a jointer due to the risk of the wood rolling and the operator’s fingers being cut by the jointer blades.

Regular inspection and maintenance of cutter knives is also considered critical. Knives should be sharp, securely fastened, and set to identical height to minimize vibration and mechanical stress. Improperly maintained cutter heads can increase both injury risk and premature machine wear. As a result, many shared workshops and training facilities require formal instruction or certification before allowing independent use of jointers.

== See also ==
- Combination machine
- Thickness planer
