= Edge routing =

Edge routing may refer to:

- Routing a moulding on the edge of a piece of timber or other material.
- Network routing at the edge of a network (the routers concerned being called Edge routers):
  - By use of an edge routing protocol such as EBGP,
  - By other means.
