= CNC wood router =

CNC router tool

A CNC wood router is a CNC router that creates objects from wood, and controls tool paths by computer numerical control (CNC). The CNC works on the Cartesian coordinate system (X, Y, Z) for 3D motion control. Parts of a project can be designed in the computer with a CAD/CAM program, and then cut automatically using a router or other cutters to produce a finished part. The CNC router is ideal for hobbies, engineering prototyping, product development, art, and production work.

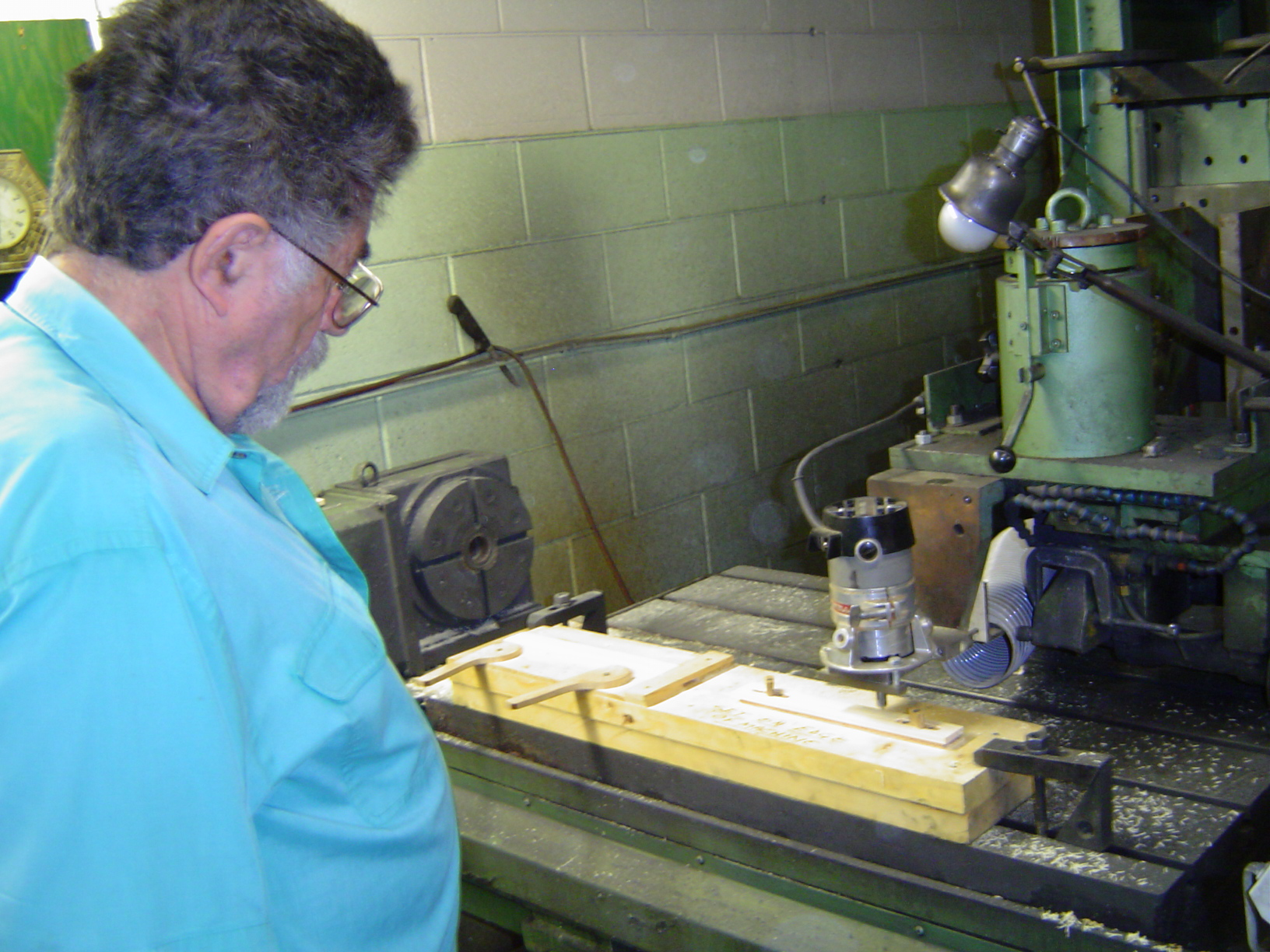
A CNC metalworking machine with a wood router attached to it, turning it into a makeshift CNC router. Cutting bit rotation speeds on metal working equipment is typically too slow to produce good results in wood.

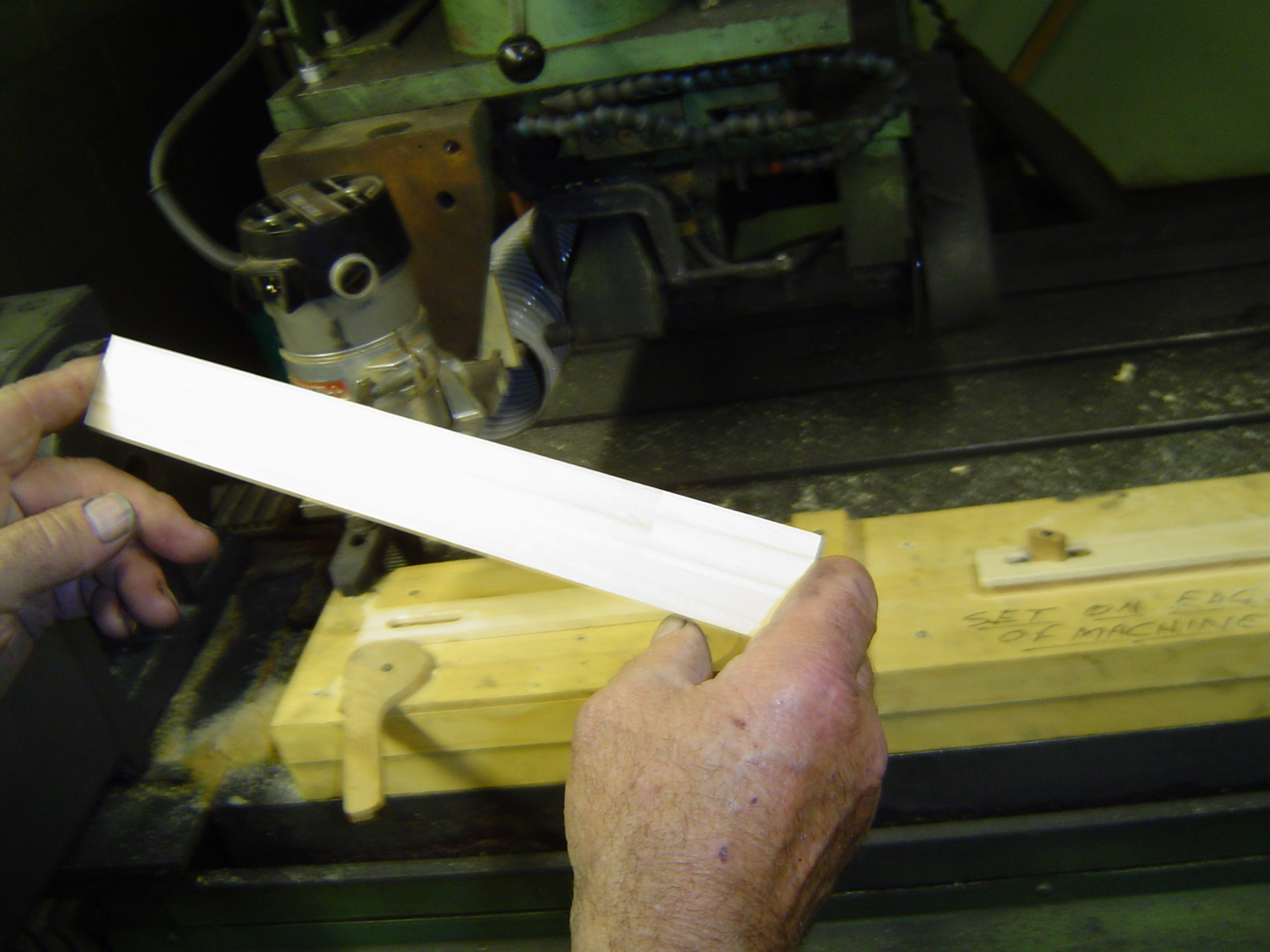
Typical wood piece before router cutting

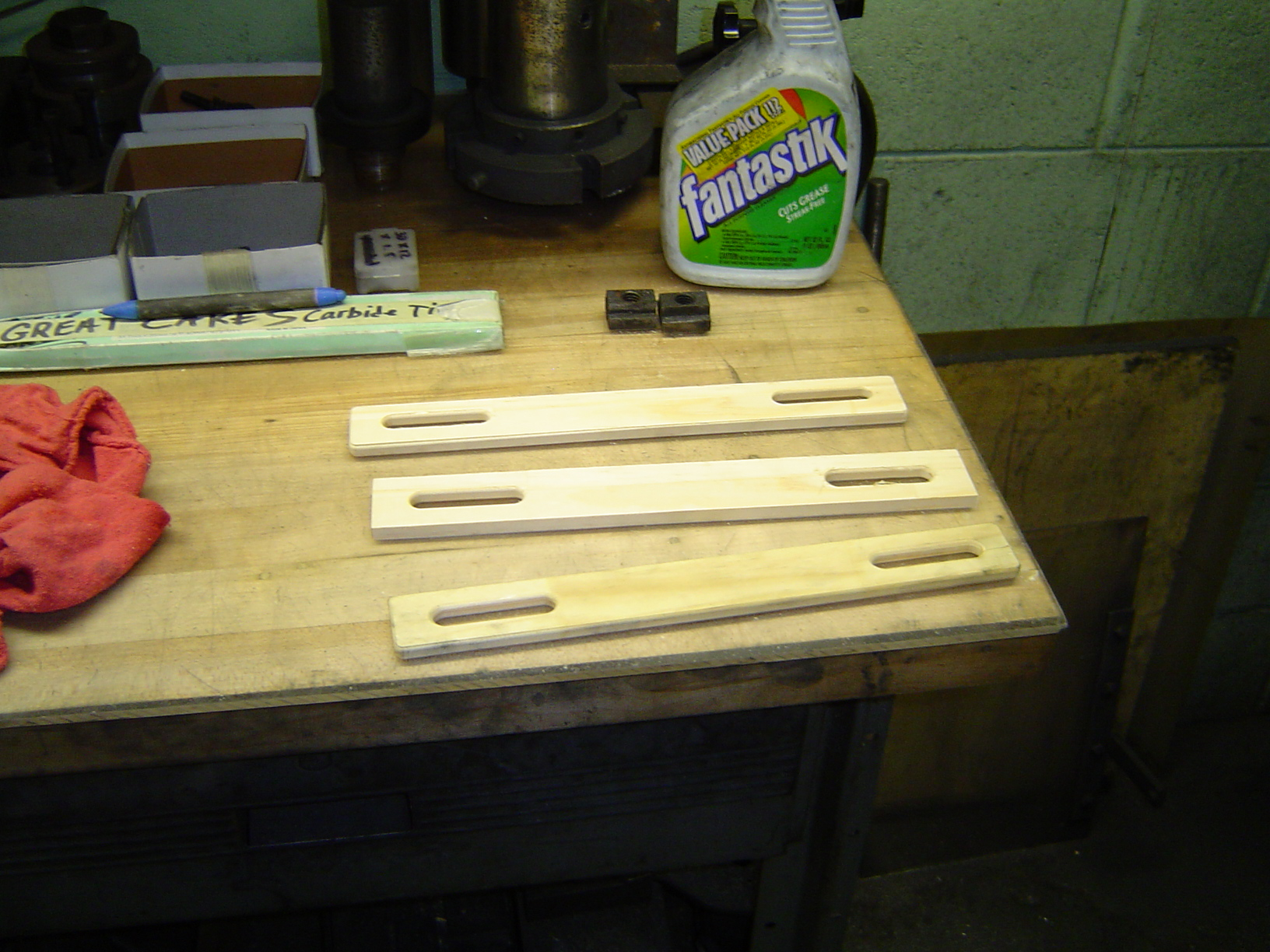
Typical work done by a CNC wood router

== Operation ==
A CNC wood router uses CNC (computer numerical control) and is similar to a metal CNC mill with the following differences:

- The wood router typically spins faster — with a range of 13,000 to 24,000 RPM
- Professional quality machines frequently use surface facing tools up to 3" in diameter or more, and spindle power from 5 to 15 horsepower. Machines capable of routing heavy material at over a thousand inches per minute are common.
- Some machines use smaller toolholders MK2 (Morse taper #2 - on older machines), ISO-30, HSK-63 or the tools just get held in a collet tool holder affixed directly to the spindle nose. ISO-30 and HSK-63 are rapid-change toolholding systems. HSK-63 has begun to supplant the ISO-30 as the rapid change standard in recent years.

A wood router is controlled in the same way as a metal mill, but there are CAM and CAD applications such as Artcam, Mastercam, Bobcad, and AlphaCam, which are specifically designed for use with wood routers.

Wood routers are frequently used to machine other soft materials such as plastics.

Typical three-axis CNC wood routers are generally much bigger than their metal shop counterparts. 5' x 5', 4' x 8', and 5' x 10' are typical bed sizes for wood routers. They can be built to accommodate very large sizes up to, but not limited to 12' x 100'. The table can move, allowing for true three-axis (xyz) motion, or the gantry can move, which requires the third axis to be controlled by two slaved servo motors.

== Advantages ==
The advantages of CNC wood router (compared to general machine) as follows,

- High degree of automation
- Consistent quality
- High productivity
- Processing complex shape
- Easy to implement CAD/CAM
- 2D, 2.5D and 3D capable

== Components ==
=== Separate heads ===
Some wood routers have multiple separate heads that can come down simultaneously or not. Some routers have multiple heads that can run complete separate programs on separate tables all while being controlled by the same interface.

=== Dust collection / vacuum collector ===
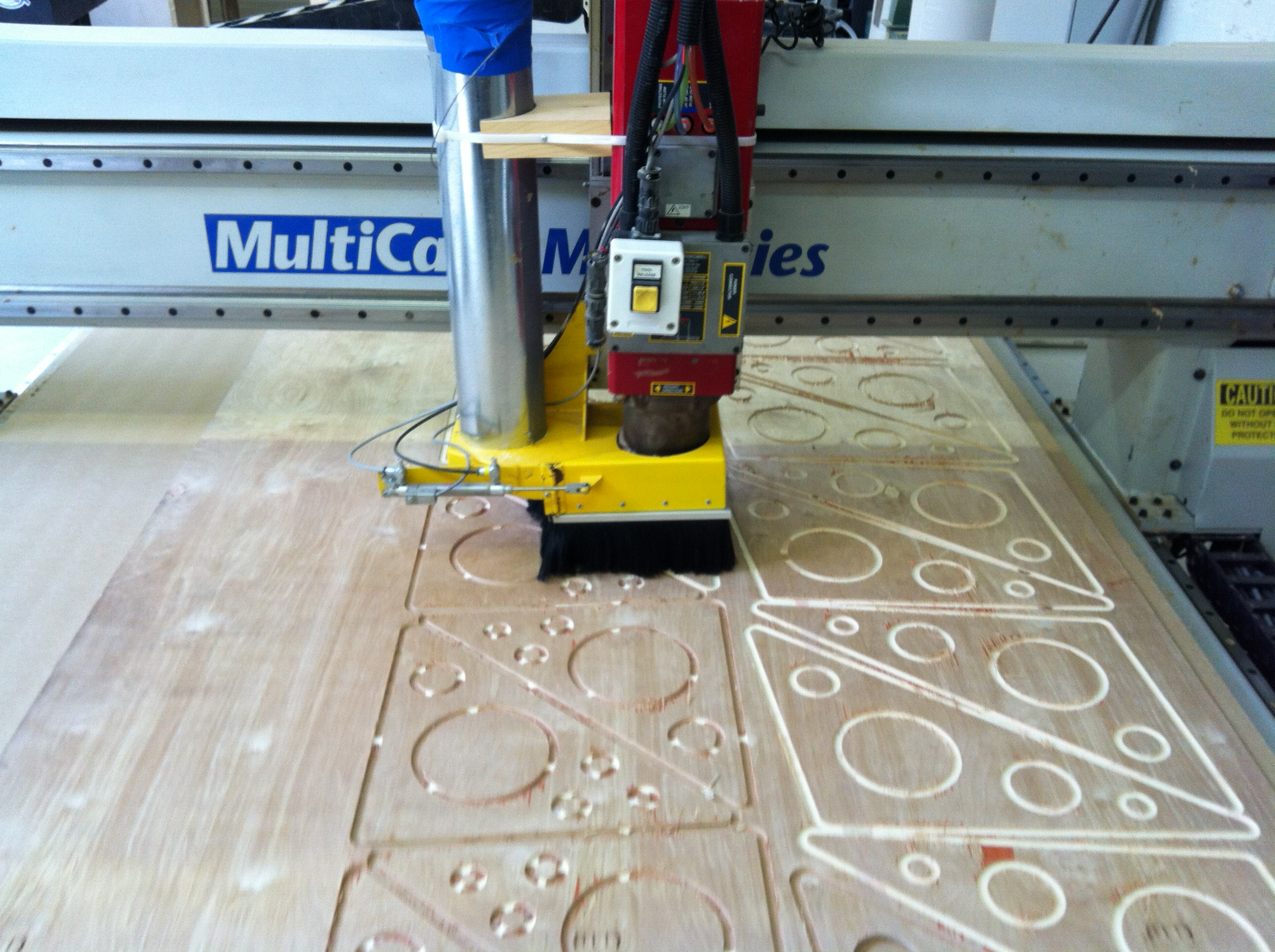
A CNC router with brushes to prevent chips and dust escaping

The wood router typically has 6"-10" air ducts to suck up the wood chips and dust created. They can be piped to a stand-alone or full shop dust collection system.

Some wood routers are specialized for cabinetry and have many drills that can be programmed to come down separately or together. The drills are generally spaced 32 mm apart on centres - a spacing system called 32 mm System. This is for the proper spacing of shelving for cabinets. Drilling can be vertical or horizontal (in the Y or X axis from either side/end of the workpiece) which allows a panel to be drilled on all four edges as well as the top surface. Many of these machines with large drilling arrays are derived from CNC point-to-point borers.

== Securing the workpiece ==
=== Suction systems ===
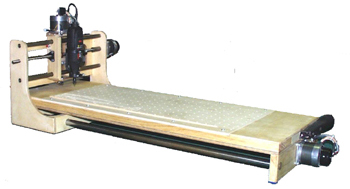
A typical CNC wood router with suction holes visible

The wood router typically holds wood with suction through the table or pods that raise the work above the table. Pods may be used for components which require edge profiling (or undercutting), are manufactured from solid wood or where greater flexibility in production is required. This type of bed requires less extraction with greater absolute vacuum.

A second type hold down uses a spoil board. This allows vacuum suction through a low density table and allows the placement of parts anywhere on the table. These types of tables are typically used for nest-based manufacturing (NBM) where multiple components are routed from a single sheet. This type of manufacturing precludes edge drilling or undercut edge work on components.

Vacuum pumps are required with both types of tables where volume and "strength" are determined based on the types of materials being cut.

== Maintenance ==
Proper operation and maintenance in right way can greatly extend machine's life and reduce the incidence of failures.

- Avoid the direct sunlight, excessive dust and humidity
- Keep away from the equipment with high vibration
- Keep dust and similar away from wheels and bearings, use compressed air
