= Router table =

Router table may refer to

- Routing table - a concept in computer networking
- Router table (woodworking) - a power tool used in woodworking
