= CNC router =

Computer-controlled cutting machine

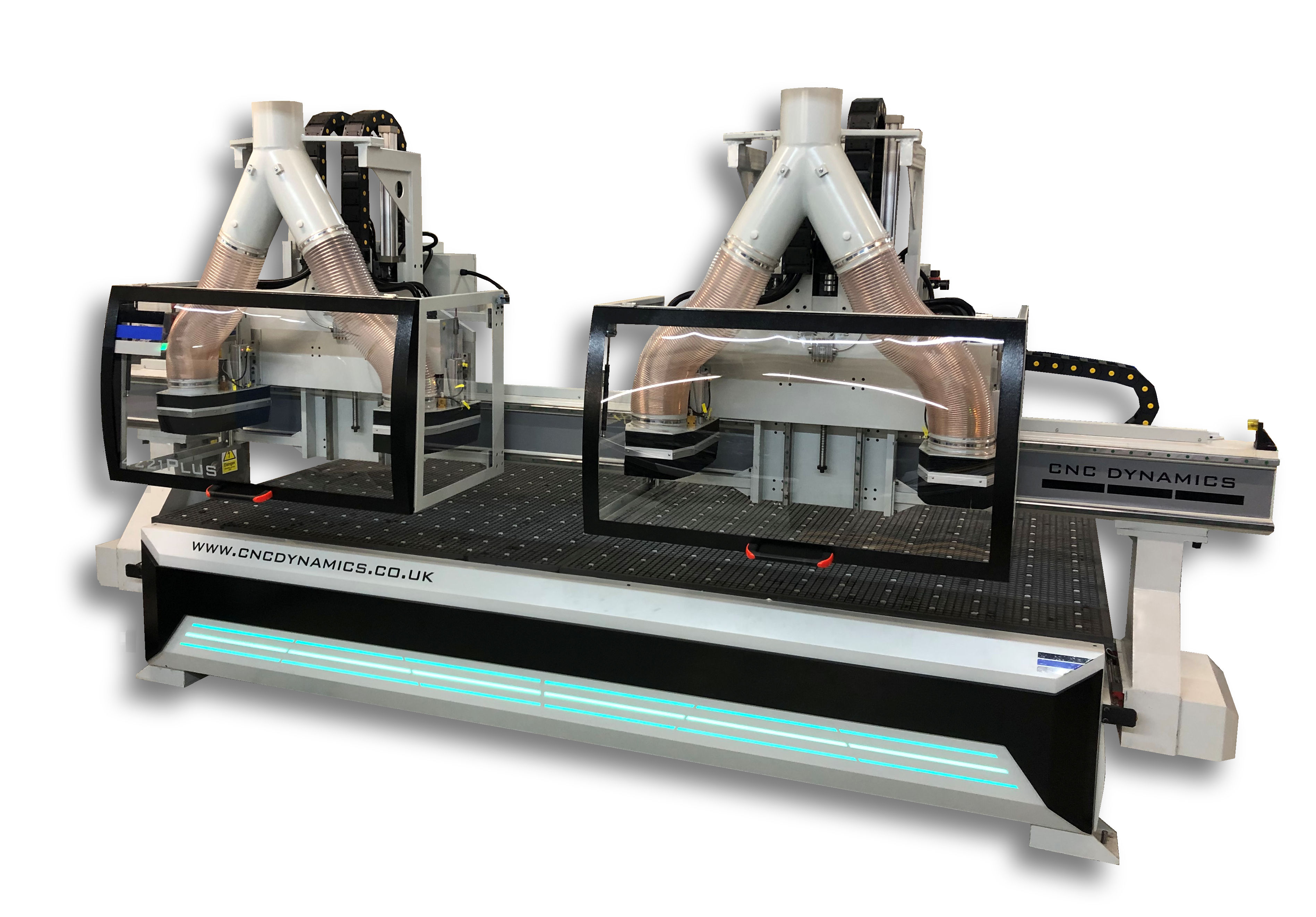
CNC Dynamics Twin Head Router

A computer numerical control (CNC) router is a computer-controlled cutting machine which typically mounts a hand-held router as a spindle which is used for cutting various materials, such as wood, composites, metals, plastics, glass, and foams. CNC routers can perform the tasks of many carpentry shop machines such as the panel saw, the spindle moulder, and the boring machine. They can also cut joinery such as mortises and tenons.

A CNC router is very similar in concept to a CNC milling machine. Instead of routing by hand, tool paths are controlled via computer numerical control. The CNC router is one of many kinds of tools that have CNC variants.

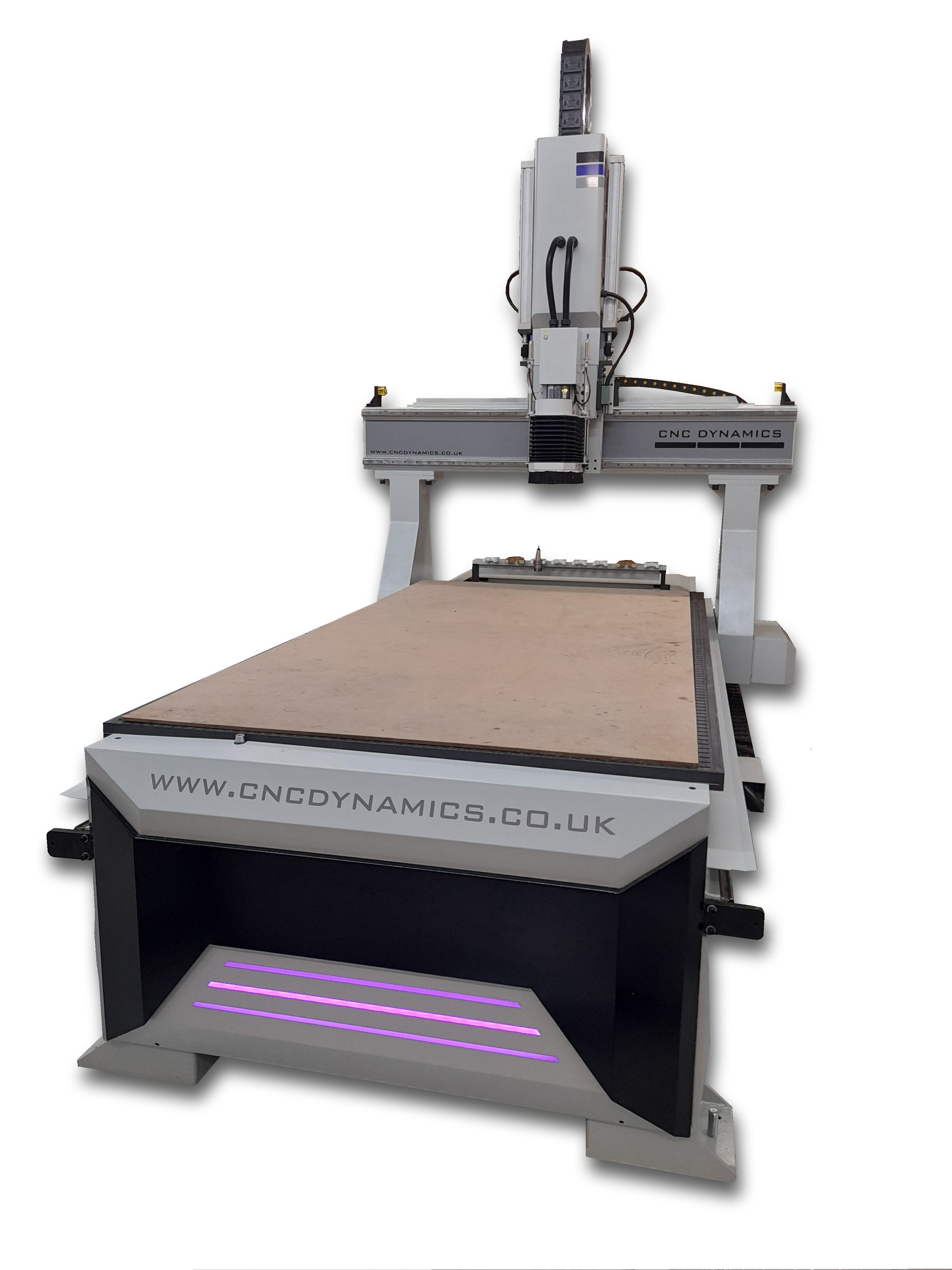
CNC Dynamics Pattern Maker

== Applications ==
A CNC router can be used to produce items such as door carvings, interior and exterior decorations, wood panels, sign boards, wooden frames, moldings, musical instruments, furniture. In addition, they see use in industry in the thermoforming of plastics by automating the trimming process. CNC routers can help ensure part repeatability and sufficiently efficient output for production, or allow one-off designs to be made.

== Use ==
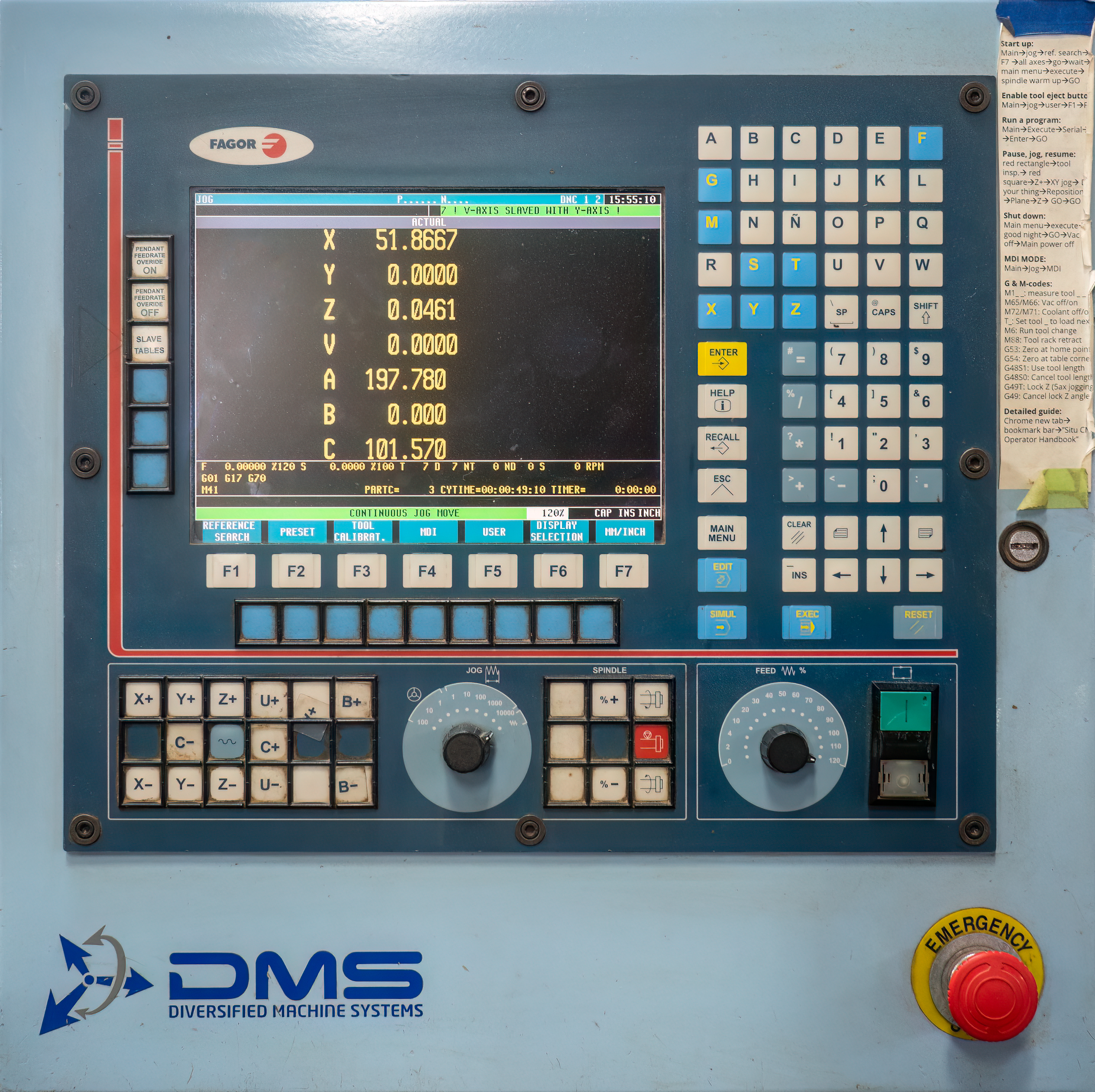
Control panel for a large DMS 5-axis CNC router

CNC routers are controlled by a computer. Coordinates are uploaded into the machine controller from a separate program. CNC router are often used with two software applications—one to make designs (CAD) and another to translate those designs into a G-code or M-code program of instructions for the machine (CAM) in vertical, horizontal and perpendicular coordinates. As with CNC milling machines, CNC routers can be controlled directly by manual programming, but CAD/CAM allows wider possibilities for contouring, speeding up the programming process and in some cases creating programs whose manual programming would be impractical. On some controllers the G-code can be loaded as a vector file on the router control panel. A vector file can be created from a picture file by using a drawing (CAD) software.

The human operator selects the machine tool (such as a 1/4-inch (6-MM) v-bit or a 3/4-inch core box bit), speed, cut depth and tool path. For cut path, most machines give the options of tracing the vectors, cutting outside the vectors, or cutting inside the vectors. The operator determines the center point of the part, clamps the part onto the table, moves the bit directly above the marked center and down to the face of the part, and marks this as the starting point. The operator moves the bit up a few inches and selects the run G-code function. The machine begins to cut the design.

== Computer-aided manufacturing ==
CAM software makes the CAD drawing/design into a code called G-code. The illustration shows what a bare-bones CNC machine might look like without its computer controller.

== Sizes and configurations ==
CNC routers come in many configurations, from small home-style D.I.Y. "desktop", to large industrial routers manufactured for commercial use. CNC routers are used in sign shops, cabinet making, aerospace and boat-making.

Although there are many configurations, most CNC routers have a few specific parts: a dedicated CNC controller, one or more spindle motors, servo motors or stepper motors, servo amplifiers, AC inverter frequency drives, linear guides, ball screws and a workspace bed or table.

In addition, CNC routers may have accessories such as vacuum pumps, with grid table tops or t-slot hold down fixtures to hold the parts in place for cutting. CNC routers are typically available in 3-axis and 5-axis CNC formats. Many manufacturers offer A and B axis for full 5-axis capabilities and rotary 4th axis. Common industrial CNC router sizes include 4 × 8 feet and 5 × 10 feet.

Many CNC routers today are made of aluminum extrusion which provide great flexibility as this can be shipped from almost anywhere unassembled but also provides size options. Some popular extrusion used are MakerSlide, V-Slot linear rail, and 8020 T-Slotted profile.

== Materials ==
=== Wood ===
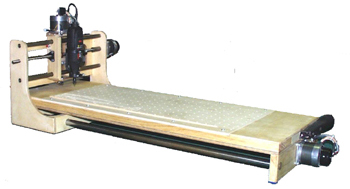
A typical CNC wood router

A CNC wood router is a computer-controlled router tool that carves/etches objects or images into the face of a piece of wood. The CNC Router is ideal for hobbies, engineering prototyping, product development, art, and production works. The CNC works on the Cartesian coordinate system (X, Y, Z) for 3D motion control; however, typical CNC operated systems can only make carvings on flat planes. The machine sits on a track and is not capable of making round or spherical cuts. Parts of a project can be designed in the computer with a CAD/CAM program, and then cut automatically using a router or other cutters to produce a finished part. In some instances, the table will not come with a router included. This allows the user to change out routers for different applications. For lighter strained cuts, they could use a lower grade router but for more intensive applications.

=== Metal ===
Milling is the machining process of using rotary cutters to remove material from a workpiece advancing (or feeding) in a direction at an angle with the axis of the tool. It covers a wide variety of operations and machines, on scales from small individual parts to large, heavy-duty gang milling operations. It is one of the most commonly used processes in industry and machine shops today for machining parts to precise sizes and shapes.

=== Stone ===
A stone CNC router is a type of CNC router machine designed for marble, granite, artificial stone, tombstone, ceramic tiles, glass machining, polishing for arts and crafts, etc. Wood, metal and stone require different "bits" or "inserts". There is bit call as diamond tools with different diameter 4mm, 6mm, 8mm mainly used. For wood CNC-ing, bits with sharp cutting edges are used, while for Stone CNC-ing, the bits are made of a metal bar with a sintered layer of extremely hard but roughly shaped particles. Routing CNC is more like grinding than cutting.

Because stone dust is very abrasive, these routers also have much better protection for the guide rails (below cover). With "wood" routers the guide rails are often visible from the outside & unprotected, while stone routers are fully covered.

Stone routers also have a water recirculation system. A small jet of water is pointed at the router bit and this captures almost all fine stone dust in the water, which then flows to a collection reservoir where the stone particles settle on the bottom.

=== Polyurethane foam ===
Polyurethane foam can also be cut using a CNC router in order to produce complex shapes which would otherwise be difficult or impossible to replicate by hand. Depending on the type of foam being converted, a CNC router would be able to cut through up to an 8lb density. By converting a CAD design file into a CAM file, the CNC Router is able to read relevant information and produce a highly accurate finished product.

Styrofoam can also be cut using a CNC router, making it an ideal material for creating detailed prototypes, signage, and architectural models.
