= Planing mill =

Type of wood finishing facility

A planing mill is a facility that takes cut and seasoned wooden boards from a sawmill and turns them into finished dimensional lumber. Machines used in the mill include the planer and matcher, the molding machines, and varieties of saws. In the planing mill, planer operators use machines that smooth and cut the wood for many different uses.
