= Laminate trimmer =

Woodworking power tool

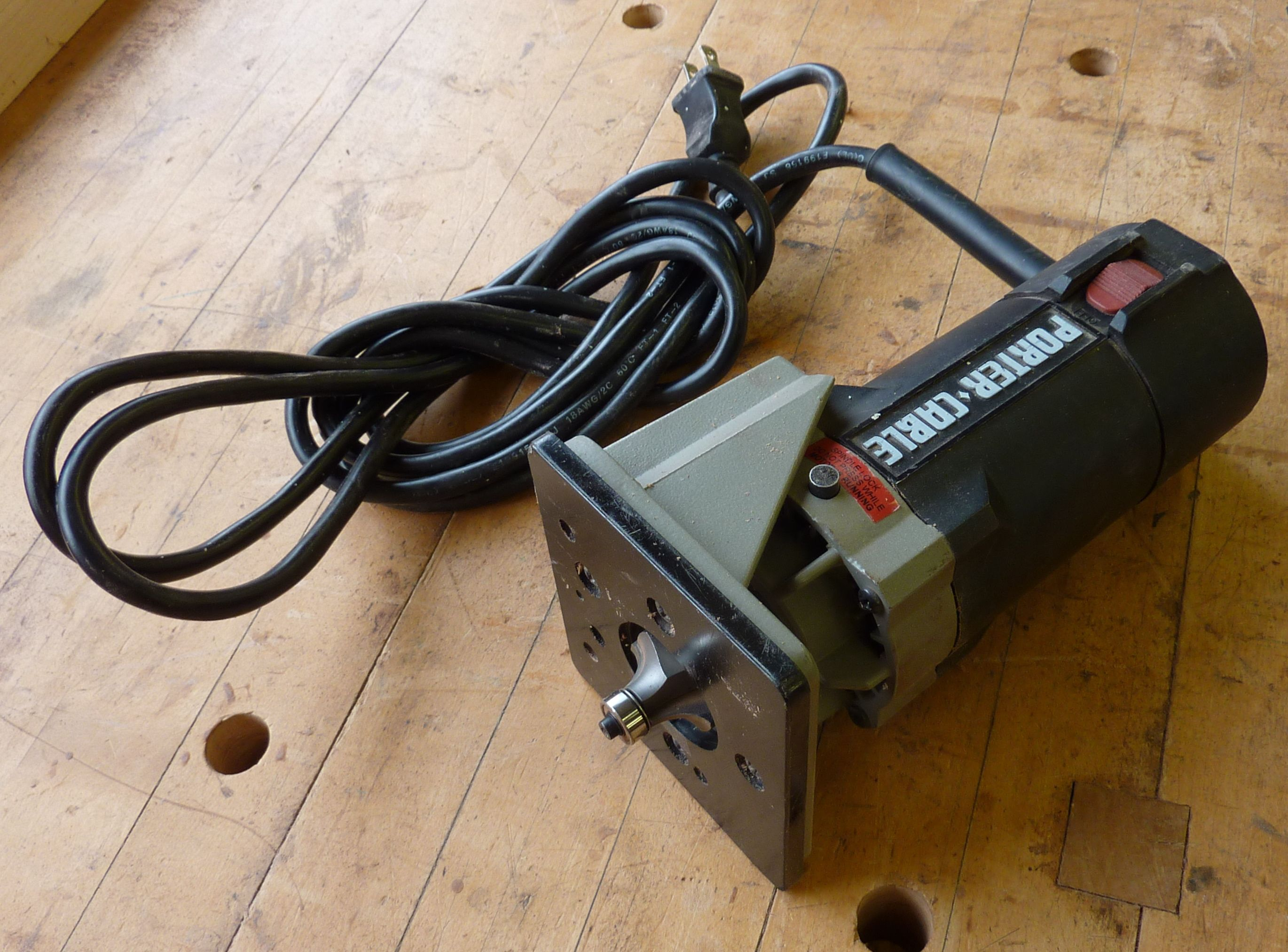
A Porter-Cable laminate trimmer

A laminate trimmer (or trimming router) is a small version of a wood router, normally used to trim laminate such as Formica. It generally has a 1/4-inch (6.4 mm) collet. Typical laminate trimmers spin their bits at up to 30,000 rpm. Some models provide variable speed control. Manufacturers of note include DeWalt, Ryobi, Porter Cable, Ridgid, Makita and RotoZip (Bosch).

Laminate trimmers evolved, as their name suggests, as a specialized tool for that particular trade. Veneers are typically cut oversize before being laminated to their wooden substrates. A laminate trimmer equipped with a bearing-guided flush trimming bit can be used to cut the veneer to its final size. The bearing guides the bit around the outside edge of the wood substrate, making a clean cut exactly along the edge. Laminate trimmers excel at this task due to their light weight and one-handed operation.

Laminate trimmers have evolved to the point where they are essentially fully functional miniature routers. Apart from trimming and flushing, they can be used for jointing, rounding edges, chamfering, routing grooves and dados, dovetails, even mortise and tenons. A modern laminate trimmer can perform almost any task that a larger handheld router can do, with the caveat that the smaller machine may be limited in the size of bit that can physically fit within its collet and the base plate. Larger bits, e.g. those that fit a 1/2-inch (13 mm) collet or those with larger blade diameters than the laminate trimmer's smaller baseplate hole, cannot be used at all. The reduced power of a laminate trimmer (3/4 to 1 hp [0.56 to 0.75 kW], as opposed to a typical router's 1 to 3 hp [0.75 to 2.24 kW]) may also make it unsuitable for heavy-duty router work.

Some laminate trimmers are equipped with multiple bases for different types of routing work, and most support the use of an edge guide.

Some woodworkers keep a chamfer or roundover bit permanently installed in a small laminate trimmer, since these operations are so frequently performed on many projects. This frees their main router (or router table) to do other types of work without having to constantly change between bits.

== See also ==
- Sawdust#Health hazards
- Router (woodworking)
- Biscuit joiner
