= Chip formation =

Chip formation is part of the process of cutting materials by mechanical means, using tools such as saws, lathes and milling cutters.

The formal study of chip formation was encouraged around World War II and shortly afterwards, with increases in the use of faster and more powerful cutting machines, particularly for metal cutting with the new high speed steel cutters. Pioneering work in this field was carried out by Kivima (1952) and Franz (1958).

Chip formation is usually described according to a three-way model developed by Franz. This model is best known within the field of machine tool design, although it is also used when an application area, such as woodworking, requires a vocabulary to describe chip formation in more detail than is usually attempted.

== Chip classification ==
The first three chip types are the original characterisation, by Dr. Norman Franz. The type of chip that forms depends on many factors, of both tool and material. In general, main factors are the angle formed by the edge faces of the tool and also the angle at which this is presented to the surface.

Sharpness of the cutting tool does not usually define the type of chip, but rather the quality of the chip, and the clear distinctions between types. A blunt tool produces a degenerate chip that is large, torn and varies from one means of formation to another, often leaving behind a poor quality surface where this means changes.

=== Type I chip ===
Type I chip

Type I chips form when a material splits ahead of the cutting edge, owing to some upwards wedge action of the tool exceeding the tensile strength of the material, perpendicular to the surface. They are thus particularly important in fibrous materials, such as wood, where individual fibres are strong but they may be levered apart relatively easily. Type I chips generally form in cutting by tools with shallow cutting angles.

Type I chips may form long, continuous swarf, limited in size only by the length of cut.

This is the idealised chip formation for wood shavings, particularly those produced by a well-tuned plane with a finely adjusted mouth.

=== Type II chip ===
Type II chip

Type II chips form when a shearing force is produced by the wedge of the tool angle. The material fails along a short angled plane, from the apex of the tool edge, diagonally upwards and forwards to the surface. The material deforms along this line, forming an upward curling chip. These chips generally form from intermediate cutting angles.

Type II chips may form in ductile materials, such as metals.

Type II chips may also form long, continuous swarf.

=== Type III chip ===
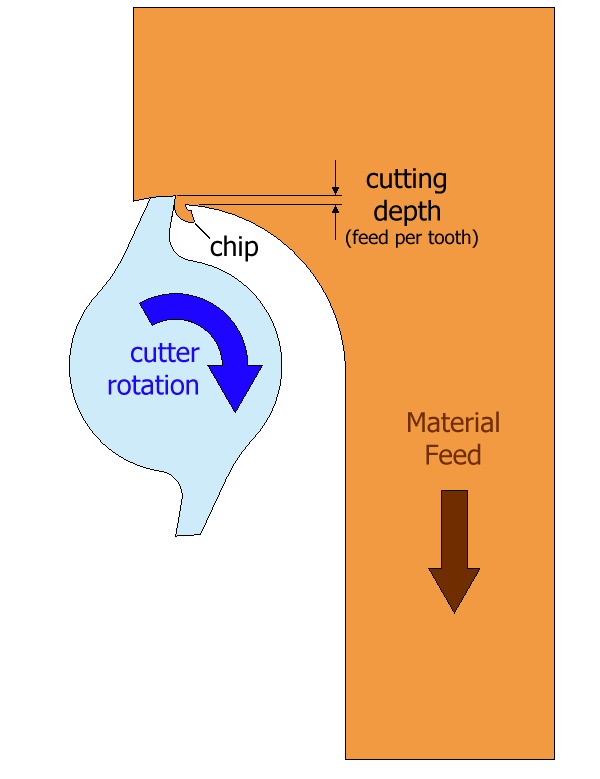
Type III chip formation during climb milling

Type III chips form a compression failure of the material, ahead of a relatively obtuse cutting angle, approaching 90°. In some weak or non-ductile materials this may form an acceptable chip, usually as a fine dust, but often it gives rise instead to a random "snowplough" effect where the waste material is bunched up ahead of the tool but not cleared decisively away as a well-formed chip.

This type of chip is formed by routers. It is also formed by woodworking scrapers, although when properly sharpened and used, these form such a thin Type III chip that it instead appears as a well-formed Type II chip. Their waste chip is thin enough that the compression failure volume is small enough to act as the well-defined shear plane of the Type II.

=== Type 0 chip ===
This type was characterised later, by William McKenzie (1960). (Note: McKenzie also used the terms Type I and Type II chips, although confusingly these are not the same as Franz'.)
