= Chamfer plane =

Woodworking tool

A chamfer plane is a specialized plane used In woodworking for making chamfered edges. The planes typically have a “v” shaped sole with a 90 degree angle. The 90 degree edge of a piece of lumber can be eased (flattened, and made less sharp) with the tool.
