= Moulding plane =

Woodworking tool for creating shaped profiles

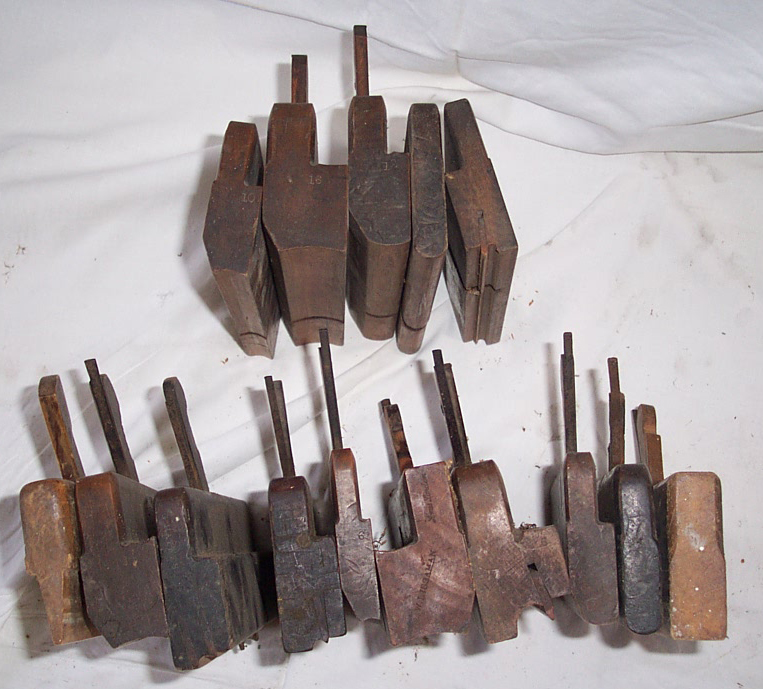
End-on shot of 15 different moulding planes. A highly detailed description of each plane is present on the image page itself

In woodworking, a moulding plane (molding plane in US spelling) is a specialized plane used for making complex wooden mouldings.

Traditionally, moulding planes were blocks of wear resistant hardwood, often beech or maple, which were worked to the shape of the intended moulding. The blade, or iron was likewise formed to the intended moulding profile and secured in the body of the plane with a wooden wedge. A traditional cabinetmakers shop might have many, perhaps hundreds, of moulding planes for the full range of work to be performed. The late nineteenth century brought modern types which were all-metal affairs such as the American Stanley No. 55 Universal Plane and the English Record No. 405 Multi-Plane with a wide variety of interchangeable cutters, integral fences, and "nickers", small cutting edges which score the grain fibers when working across the board.

Large crown mouldings required planes of six or more inches in width, which demanded great strength to push and often had additional peg handles on the sides, allowing the craftsman's apprentice or other worker to pull the plane ahead of the master who guided it.

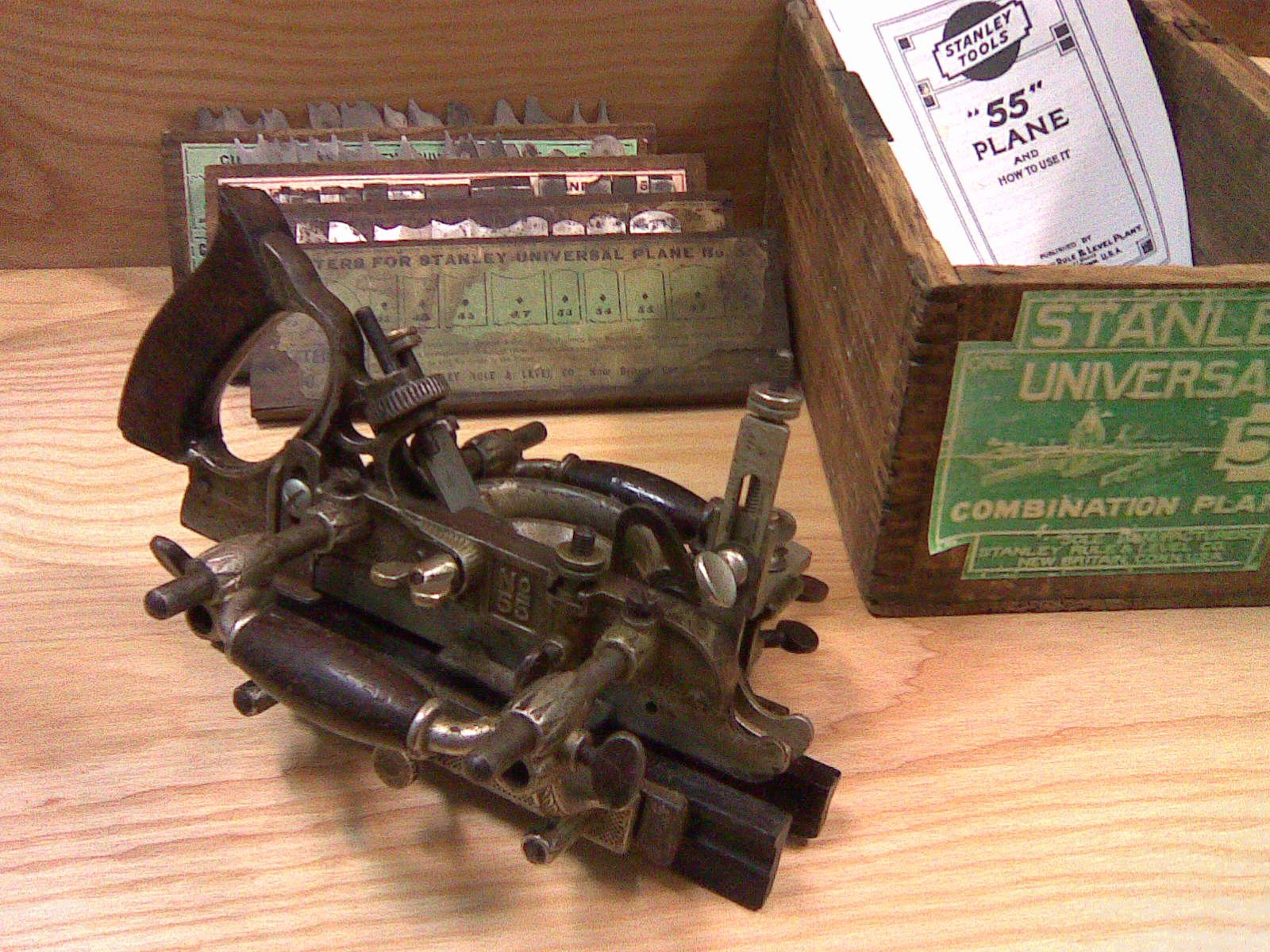
Stanley No. 55 Universal plane with wide array of interchangeable cutters.

While used much less frequently since the invention of powered router tables and shapers, a modern furniture shop doing reproduction or restoration work might keep a collection of moulding planes to match original work, or to build in an authentic manner. Modern hand tool woodworkers often keep and use multiple wood molding planes.

The earliest known record of a moulding plane is of a moulding plane iron of Roman origin unearthed in Cologne, Germany.

In modern industry, the work of the moulding plane has been taken up by the electrically powered spindle moulder or wood shaper. On a smaller scale, the hand-held or table-mounted electric router allows the use of interchangeable router bits of a wide variety of profiles and is readily available to the small business or home craftsperson.
