= Chamfer =

Flat transitional edge between two faces of an object

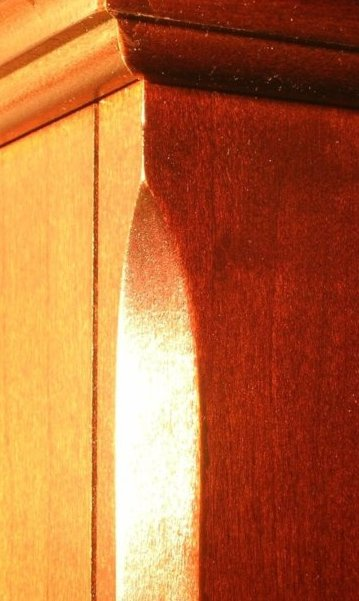
A chamfer with a "lark's tongue" finish

A chamfer (/ˈ(t)ʃæmfər/ SHAM-fər, CHAM-) is a transitional edge between two faces of an object. Sometimes defined as a form of bevel, it is often created at a 45° angle between two adjoining right-angled faces.

Chamfers are frequently used in machining, carpentry, furniture, concrete formwork, mirrors, and to facilitate assembly of many mechanical engineering designs.

== Terminology ==
In materials and manufacturing, a chamfer is used to "ease" otherwise sharp edges, both for safety and to prevent damage to the edges; it may also be a primarily decorative feature. In general terms it may be regarded as a type of bevel, and the terms are often used interchangeably. However, in machining, only the term "chamfer" is used for the specific technique, practice, and result.

In carpentry, a lark's tongue is a chamfer which ends short of the end of a piece in a gradual outward curve, leaving the remainder of the edge as a right angle. Chamfers may be formed in either inside or outside adjoining faces of an object or room.

Alternatively, a fillet (pronounced /ˈfɪlɪt/, like "fill it") is the rounding-off of an interior corner, and a round (or radius) the rounding of an outside one. A broad radius is known as a bullnose.

== Carpentry and furniture ==
Chamfers are widely used in carpentry, added both for safety and decorative effect to counters and furniture such as table tops. Special tools such as chamfer mills, chamfer planes, and chamfer bits in shapers and routers are sometimes used to ease edges.

== Architecture ==
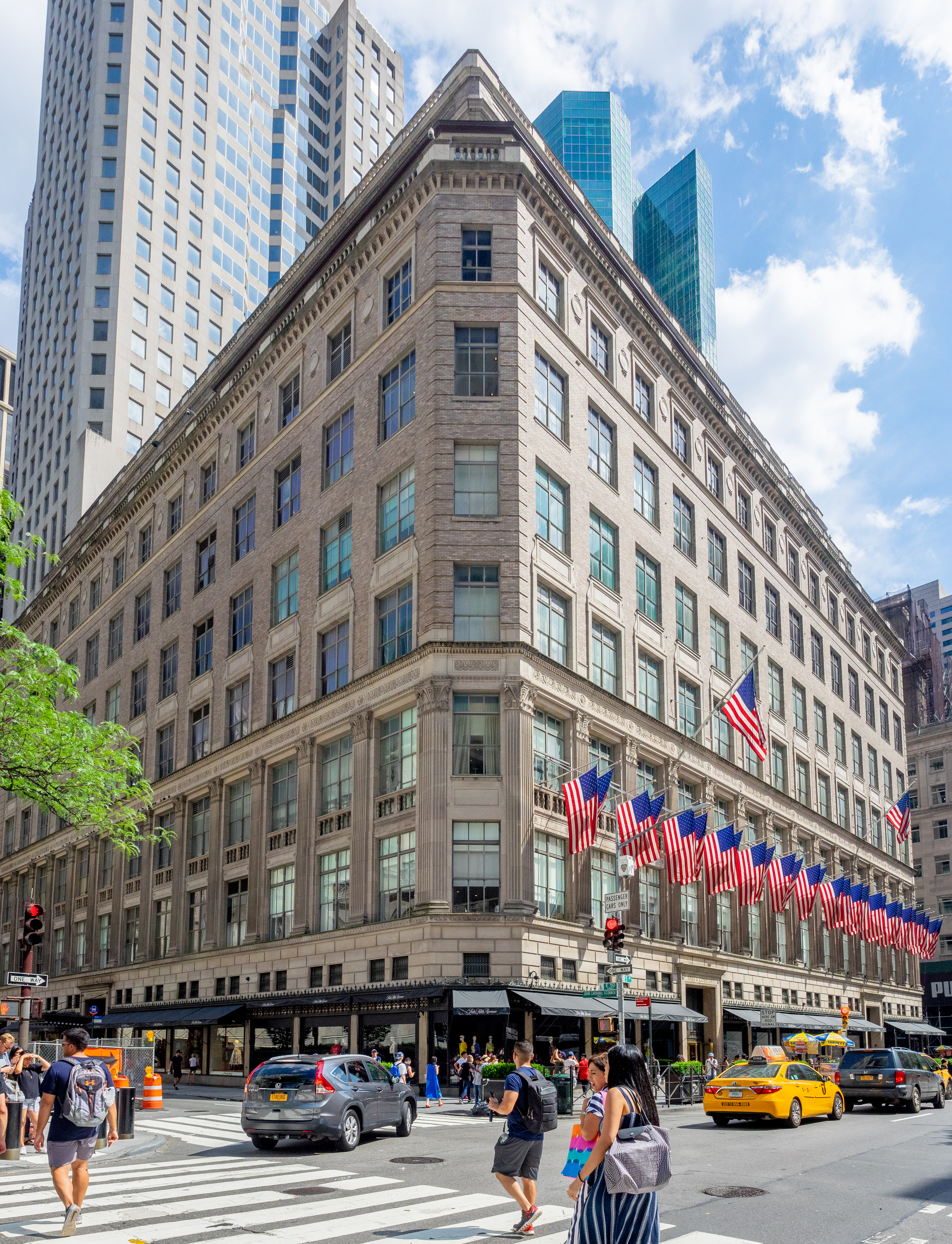
Chamfer on the facade of Saks Fifth Avenue in New York City

Chamfers are commonly used in architecture, both for functional and aesthetic reasons. For example, the base of the Taj Mahal is a cube with chamfered corners, thereby creating an octagonal architectural footprint. Its great gate is formed of chamfered base stones and chamfered corbels for a balcony or equivalent cornice towards the roof.

== Urban planning ==
Many city blocks in Barcelona, Valencia and various other cities in Spain, as well as Taichung, and street corners (curbs) in Ponce, Puerto Rico, are chamfered. The chamfering was designed as an embellishment and a modernization of urban space in Barcelona's mid-19th century Eixample or Expansion District, where the buildings follow the chamfering of the sidewalks and streets. This pioneering design opens up broader perspectives, provides pleasant pedestrian areas and allows for greater visibility while turning. It might also be considered to allow for turning to be somewhat more comfortable as, supposedly, drivers would not need to slow down as much when making a turn as they would have to if the corner were a square 90 degrees, although, in Barcelona, most chamfered corners are used as parking spaces or loading–unloading zones, leaving the traffic to run as in normal 90-degree street corners.

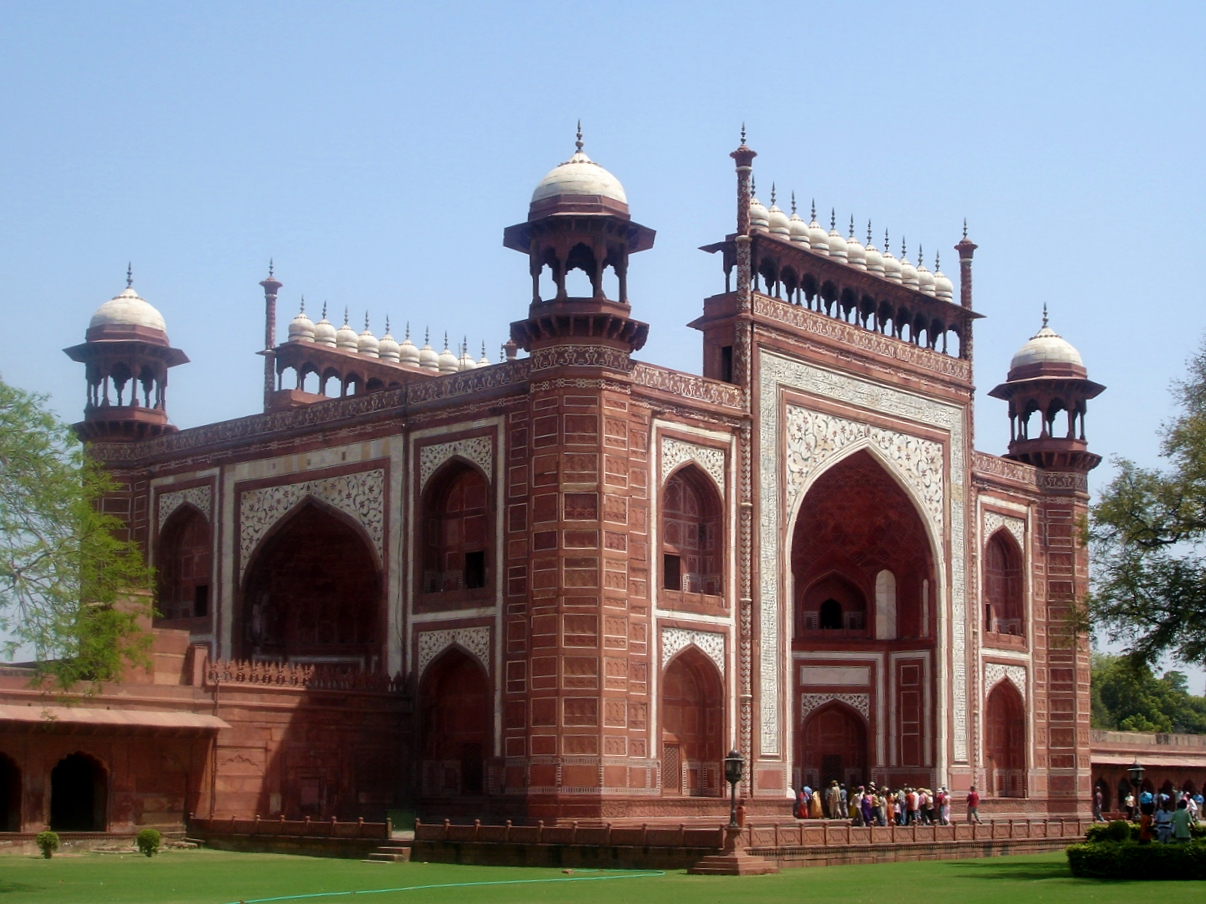
The Great gate (Darwaza-i rauza) gateway to the Taj Mahal, having chamfered tower corners

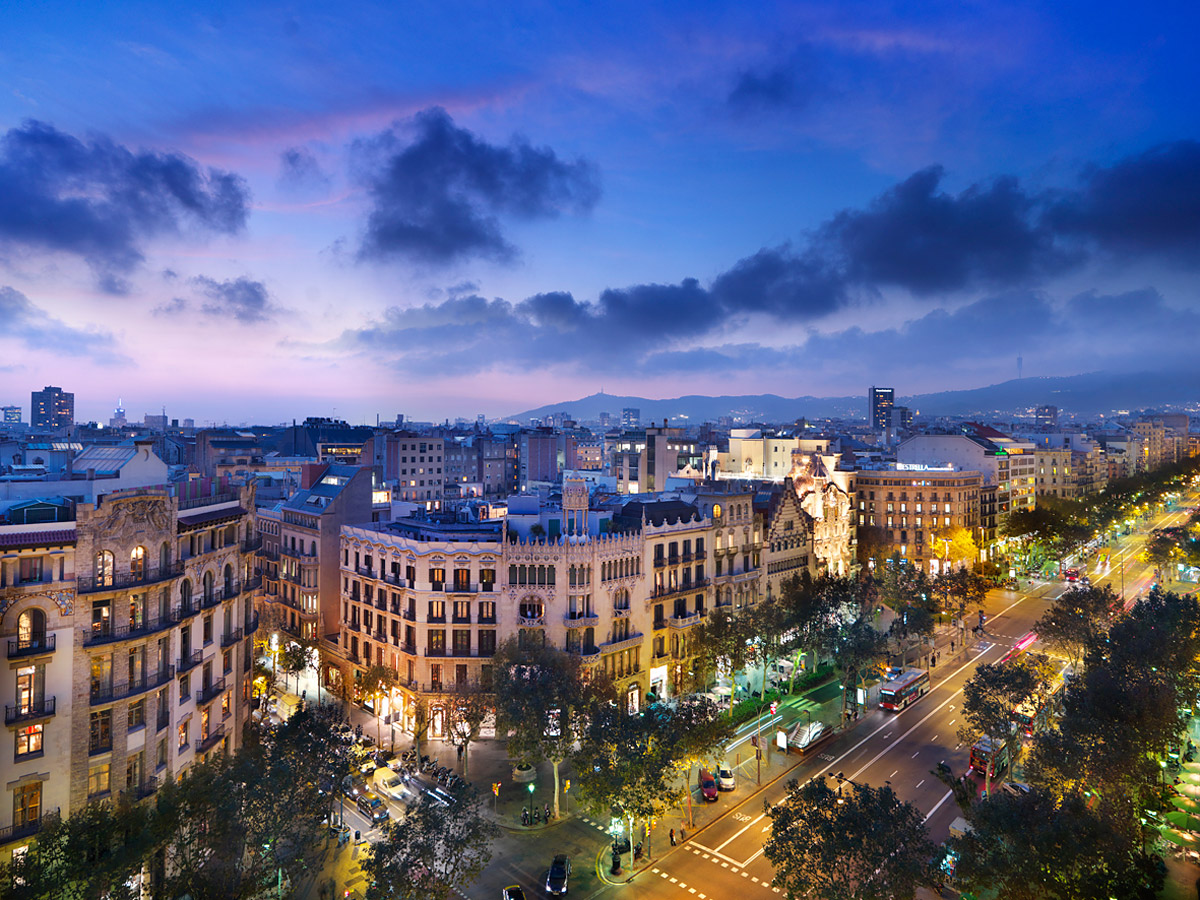
A chamfered building and street corner on Barcelona's Passeig de Gràcia. Here the building is chamfered but the sidewalk/street has taken on a conventional, 90-degree layout, eliminating the loading zone or parking spaces.

The original Barcelona Eixample city block design, showing the chamfered corners of buildings and streets

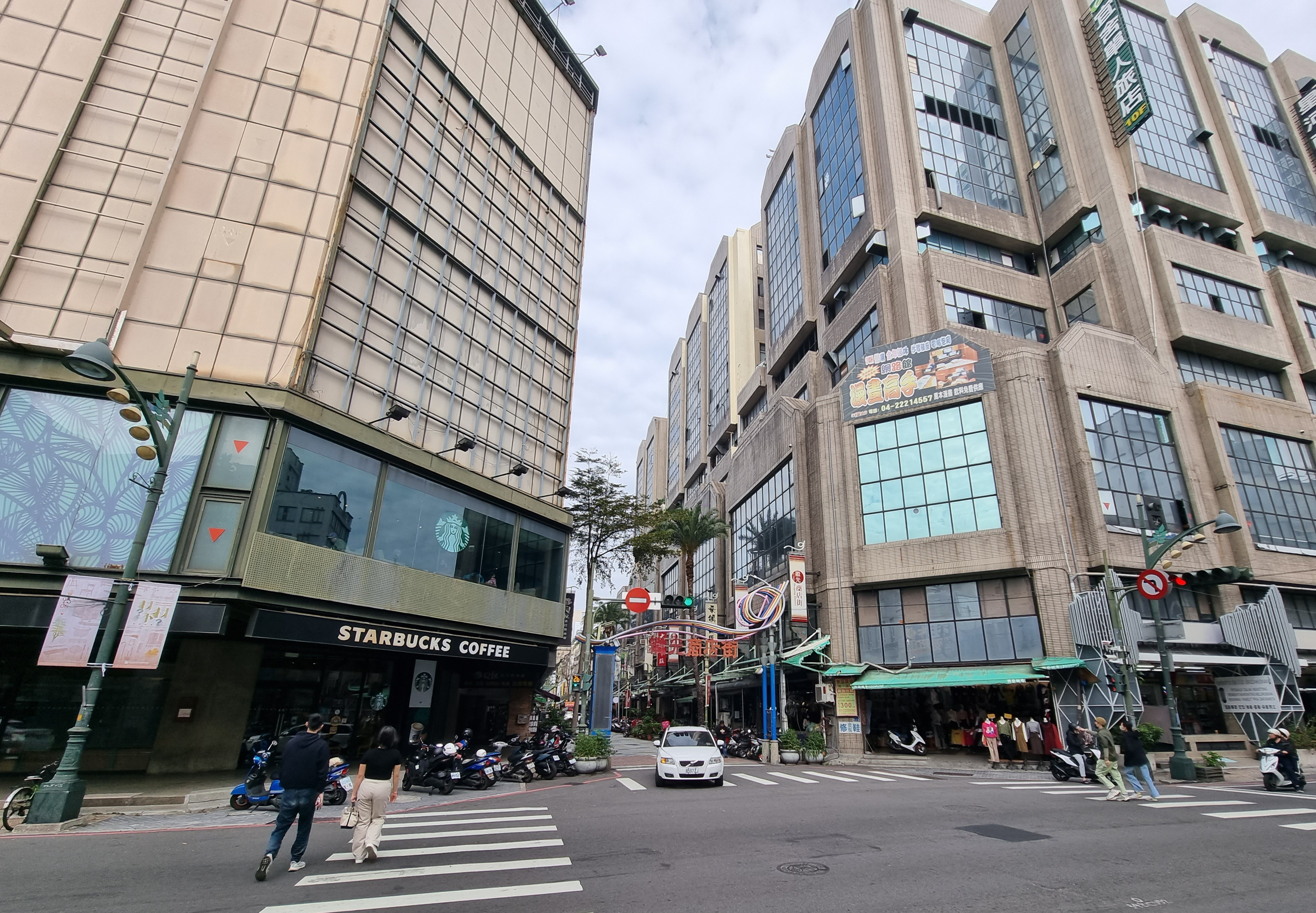
A pair of typical chamfrered corner buildings in central Taichung

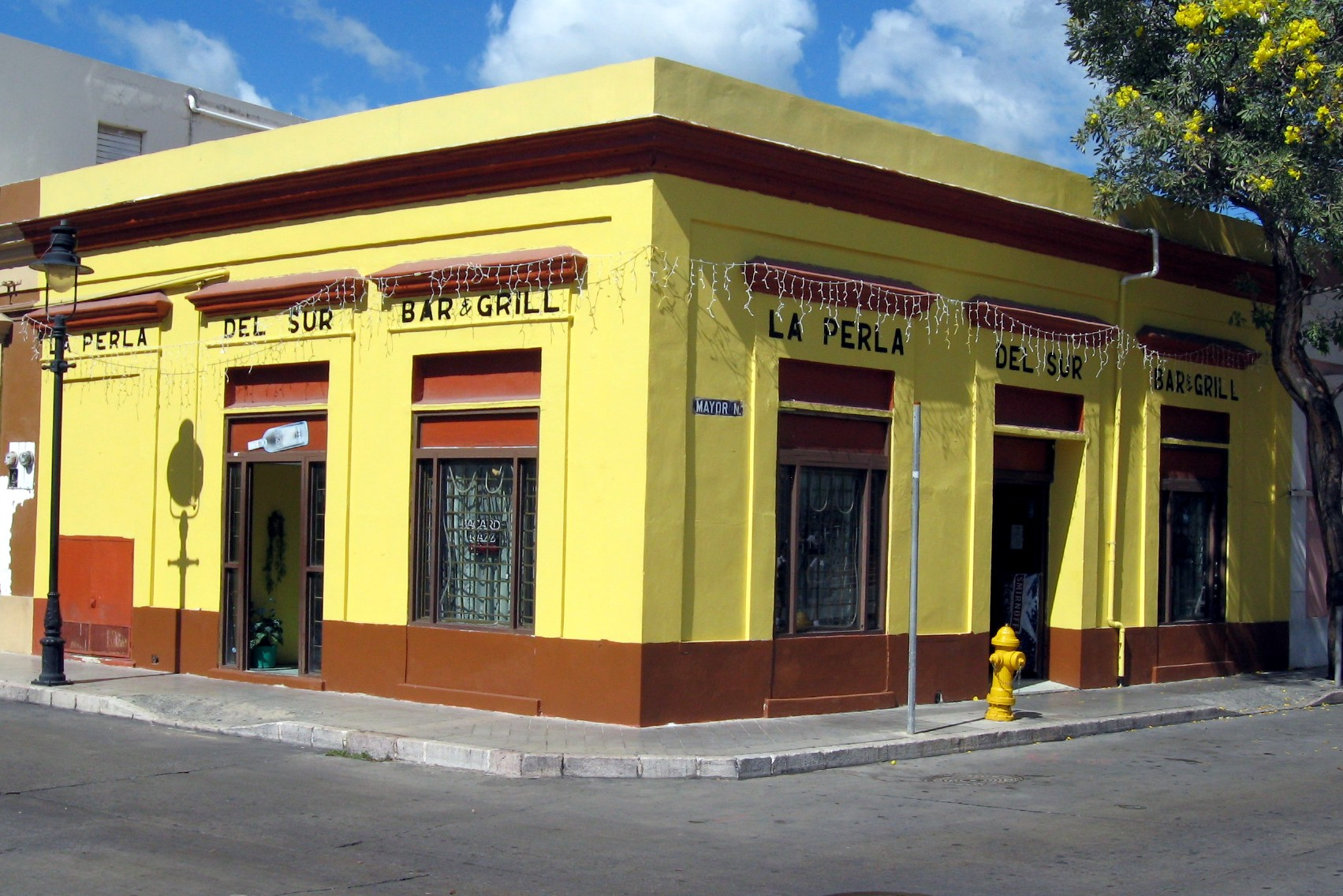
A chamfered sidewalk street corner in historic Ponce, Puerto Rico

== Mechanical engineering ==
Terminology for rounding on a mechanical part

Chamfers are frequently used to facilitate assembly of parts which are designed for interference fit or to aid assembly for parts inserted by hand. Resilient materials such as fluid power seals generally require a shallower angle than 45 degrees, often 20. In assemblies, chamfers are also used to clear an interior radius – perhaps from a cutting tool, or to clear other features, such as a weld bead, on an adjoining part. This is because it is generally easier to manufacture and much easier to precisely check the dimensions of a chamfer than a radius, and errors in the profile of either radius could otherwise cause interference between the radii before the flat surfaces make contact with one another. Chamfers are also essential for components which humans will handle, to prevent injuries, and also to prevent damage to other components. This is particularly important for hard materials, like most metals, and for heavy assemblies, like press tools. Additionally, a chamfered edge is much more resistant than a square edge to being bruised by other edges or corners knocking against it during assembly or disassembly, or maintenance.

== Machining ==
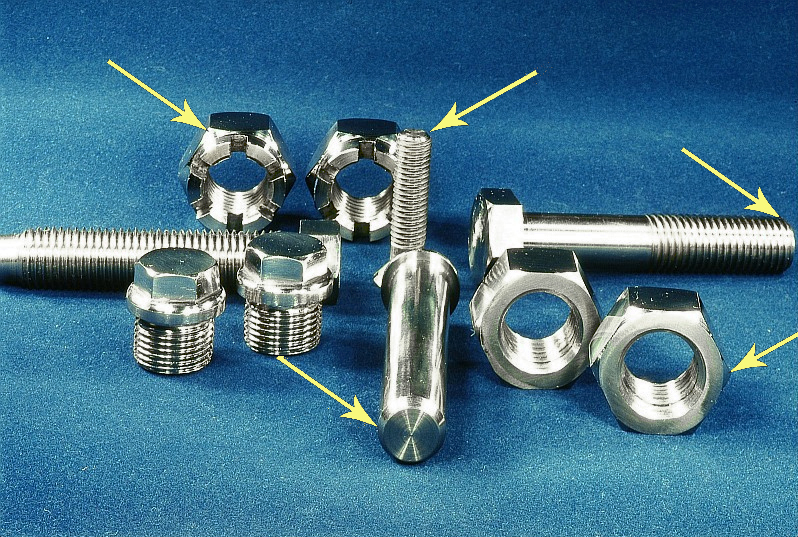
The arrows point to some of the many chamfers present.

In machining a chamfer is a slope cut at any right-angled edge of a workpiece, e.g. holes; the ends of rods, bolts, and pins; the corners of the long-edges of plates; any other place where two surfaces meet at a sharp angle. Chamfering eases assembly, e.g. the insertion of bolts into holes, or nuts. Chamfering also removes sharp edges which reduces significantly the possibility of cuts, and injuries, to people handling the metal piece. It also minimizes the introduction of rust, by eliminating the area where a ferrous material is at its thinnest and most vulnerable.

== Optical mirror design ==
Outside aesthetics, chamfering is part of the process of hand-crafting a parabolic glass telescope mirror. Before the surface of the disc can be ground, the edges must first be chamfered to prevent edge chipping. This can be accomplished by placing the disc in a metal bowl containing silicon carbide and rotating the disc with a rocking motion. The grit will thus wear off the sharp edge of the glass.
