= Router table (woodworking) =

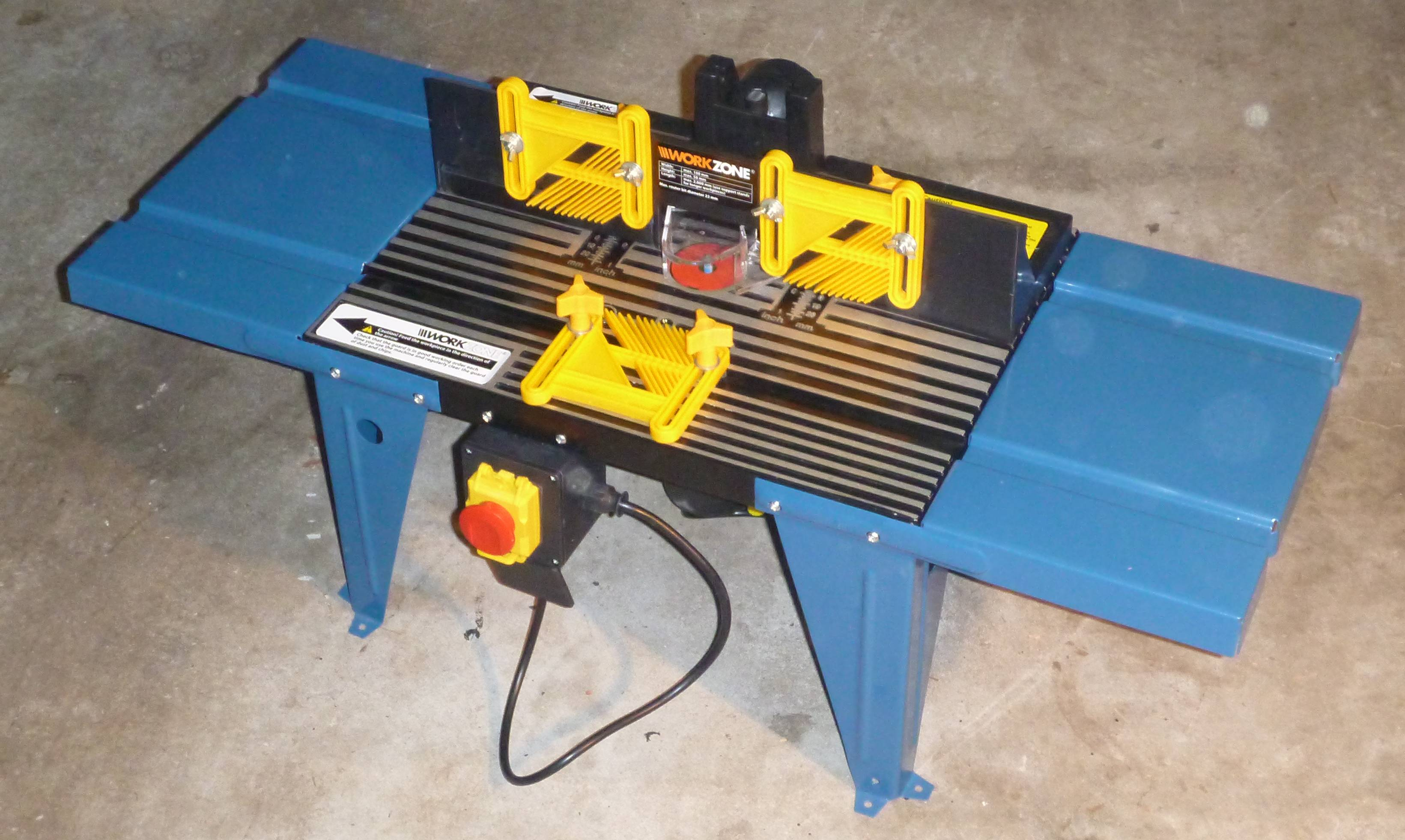
Bench top mountable router table

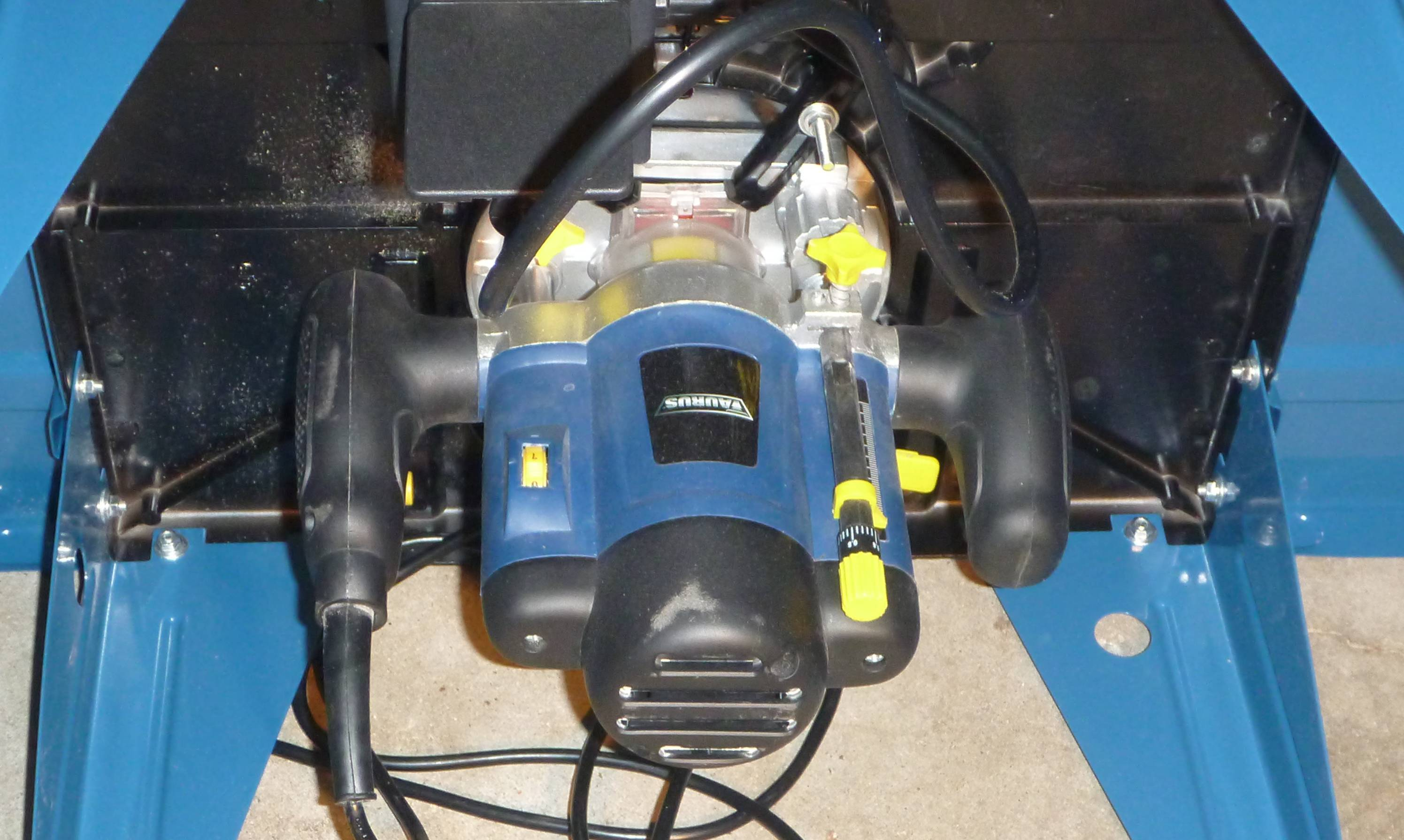
View underneath router table showing plunge router attached

A router table is a stationary woodworking machine in which a vertically oriented spindle of a woodworking router mounted under the table protrudes from the machine table and can be spun at speeds typically between 3000 and 24,000 rpm. Cutter heads (router bits) may be mounted in the spindle chuck. As the workpiece is fed into the machine, the cutters mold a profile into it. The machine normally features a vertical fence, against which the workpiece is guided to control the horizontal depth of cut. Router tables are used to increase the versatility of a hand-held router, as each method of use is particularly suited to specific application, e.g. very large workpieces would be too large to support on a router table and must be routed with a hand-held machine, very small workpieces would not support a hand-held router and must be routed on a router table with the aid of pushtool accessories etc.

== Varieties ==
Router tables exist in three varieties:

- floor standing machines
- accessories bolted into table saws
- small bench-top machines

== Use ==
Router tables are used in one of three ways. In all cases, an accessory is used to direct the workpiece.

1. A fence is used, with the router bit partially emerging from the fence. The workpiece is then moved against the fence, and the exposed portion of the router bit removes material from the workpiece.
2. No fence is used. A template is affixed to the workpiece, and a router bit with a ball bearing guide is used. The ball bearing guide bears against the template, and the router bit removes material from the workpiece so as to make the workpiece the same shape as the template.
3. A "pin router" accessory is used. A pin router originally had a pin in the table that would trace the part and hung the router motor on an "over arm" that rose from one edge or corner of the router table, arced over the table, and descends directly (coaxially) towards the pin. This was a big safety concern as people's hand were very accessible to the cutter. In 1976, C.R. Onsrud patented the Inverted Pin Router that reversed the two and mounted the motor under the table and the guide pin on the "over arm". A template (with an interior recess on the top face removed) is affixed to the workpiece, and the guide pin is lowered into this recess. The template is then moved against the pin, carrying the workpiece against the spinning router bit and creating a duplicate of the patterned part.

== History ==
Router tables evolved as shop improvised tools. Individual woodworkers began taking routers, mounting them in an inverted position beneath a table, and using the routers' depth adjustment to raise the bit through a hole in the table surface.

Over time manufacturers began selling accessories (pre-made table tops, table legs, table inserts, fences, hold downs, vertical adjustment tools ("lifts"), etc.

Finally, manufacturers began selling complete packages, such as the Inverted Pin Router, which put them in the business of effectively selling wood shapers, the very tool that shop improvised router tables were created as inexpensive substitutes for.

== See also ==
- Router (woodworking)#Table mounted router
