= Router (woodworking) =

Woodworking power tool

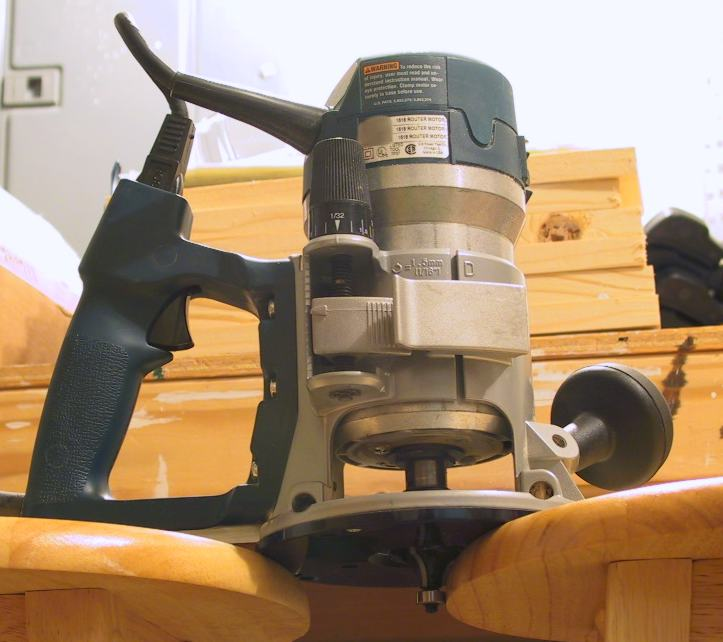
A "D-handle" fixed-base router

The router (Note: Pronounced /ˈraʊtər/) is a power tool with a flat base and a rotating bit extending past the base. The spindle may be driven by an electric motor or by a pneumatic motor. It routs (hollows out) an area in hard material, such as wood or plastic. Routers are used most often in woodworking, especially in cabinetry and moulding production. They may be handheld with the bit projected downwards or affixed to router tables, with the bit projected upwards. Some woodworkers consider the router one of the most versatile power tools.

There is also a traditional hand tool known as a router plane, a form of hand plane with a broad base and a narrow blade projecting well beyond the base plate. Either tool can be used to create and flatten the bottom of a hollowed recess in materials.

CNC wood routers add the advantages of computer numerical control (CNC).

The laminate trimmer is a smaller, lighter version of the router. Although it is designed for egde trimming laminates, it can also be used for smaller general routing work. As they are smaller and less powerful, they can be easier to control, even when using one hand.

Rotary tools can also be used similarly to routers with the right bits and accessories (such as plastic router bases).

== History ==
Before power routers existed, the router plane was often used for the same purpose.

An incremental step toward modern power routers was the foot-pedal operated router, such as the Barnes Former/Shaper, available in 1877. Barnes patented a reversible rotary cutting head in 1889.

The first portable power router was patented in 1906 by George Kelley and marketed by the Kelley Electric Machine Company. The early electric routers were quite heavy, and only nominally "portable".

In 1915 Oscar and Rudy Onsrud produced an air-powered router, which they referred to as a Jet Motor Hand Router.

In the 1930s, Stanley Works acquired a line of portable routers from Roy L. Carter, and marketed an 18000 RPM electric hand router similar to modern routers.

Further refinement produced the plunge router, invented by ELU (now part of DeWalt) in Germany around 1949.

Modern routers are often used in place of traditional moulding planes or spindle moulder machines for edge decoration (moulding) of timber.

== Process ==
Routing is a high speed process of cutting, trimming, and shaping wood, metal, plastic, and a variety of other materials.

=== Chip formation ===
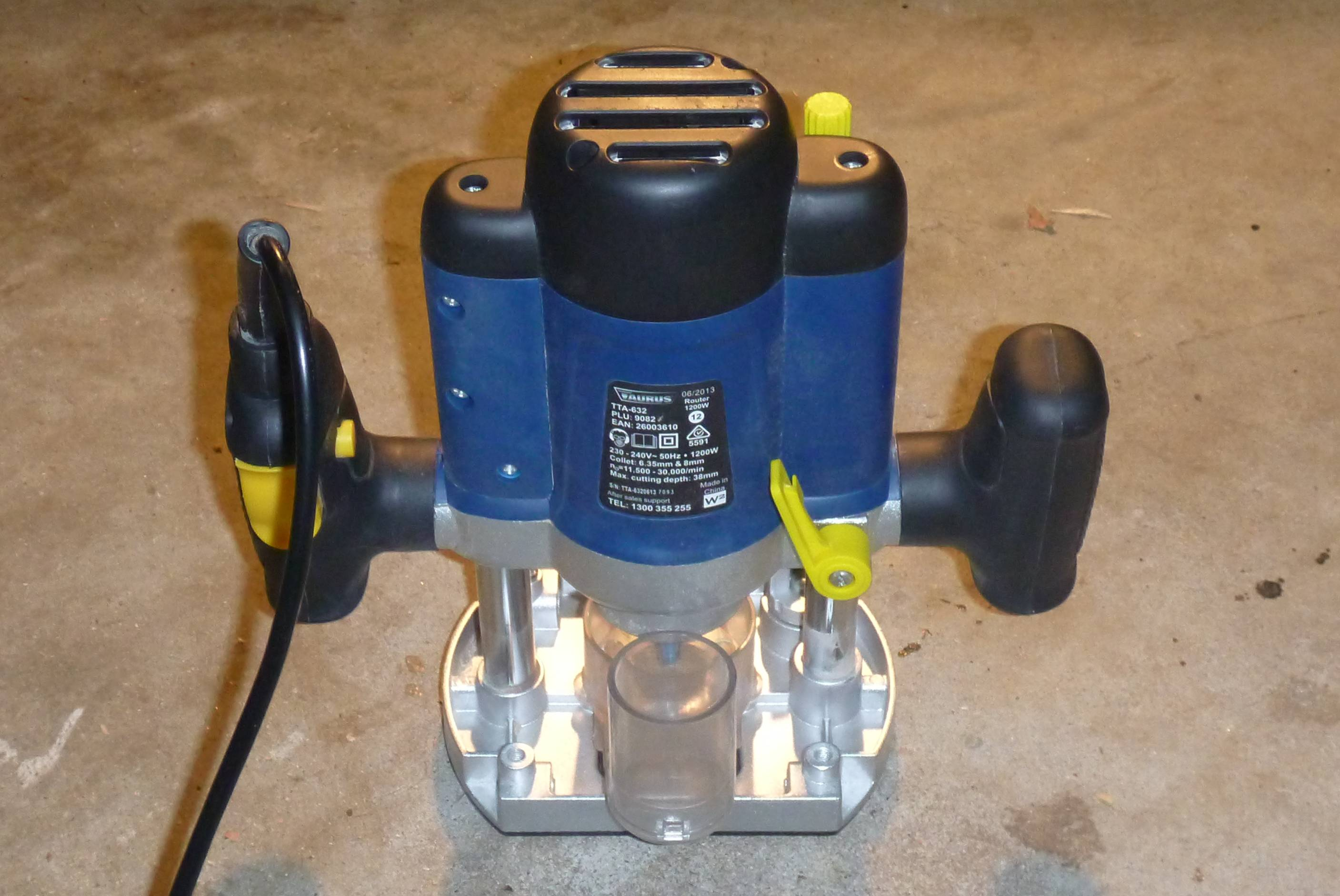
Modern plunge router showing dust extraction tube

Routing and milling are conceptually similar, and end mills can be used in routers, but routing wood is different from milling metal in terms of the mechanics. Chip formation is different, so the optimal tool geometry is different. Routing is properly applied to relatively weak and brittle materials, typically wood. As these materials are weak in small sections, routers can run at extremely high speeds, so even a small router may cut rapidly. Owing to inertia at these high speeds, the normal wood cutting mechanism of Type I chips cannot take place. The cutter edge angle is blunt, approaching 90°, and so a Type III chip forms, with waste material produced as fine dust. This dust is a respiratory hazard, even in benign materials. The forces against the cutter are light, so routers may be hand-held.

When milling metals, the material is relatively ductile, although remaining strong even at a small scale. A Type II chip forms, and waste may be produced as continuous swarf. Cutter forces are high, so milling machines must be robust and rigid, usually substantial constructions of cast iron.

Intermediate materials, such as plastics and sometimes soft aluminium, may be cut by either method, though routing aluminium is usually more of an improvised expedient than a production process, and is noisy and hard on tools.

=== Process characteristics ===
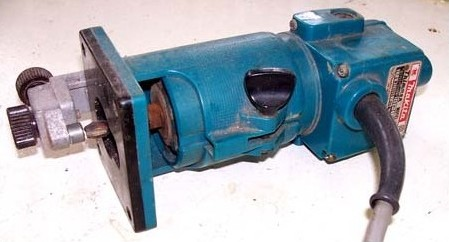
Makita laminate trimmer

Routing is usually limited to soft metals (aluminium etc.) and rigid non-metals. Specially designed cutters are used for a variety of patterns, cuts, and edging. Both hand controlled and machine controlled/aided routers are common today.

=== Workpiece geometry ===
Routing is a shaping process that produces finished edges and shapes. Some materials that are difficult to shape with other processes, such as fiber-glass, Kevlar, and graphite, can be shaped and finished neatly via various routing techniques. Apart from finished edges and shaping, cutaways, holes, and contours can also be shaped using routers.

== Tools and equipment ==
- The set up includes an air or electric driven router, a cutting tool often referred to as a router bit, and a guide template. Also the router can be fixed to a table or connected to radial arms which can be controlled more easily.
- In general there are three types of cutting bits or tools.
  1. Fluted cutters (used for edging and trimming)
  2. Profile cutters (used for shaping and trimming)
  3. Helical cutters (used on easily machined materials, for drilling, shaping, trimming)
- Safety glasses and ear protection should be worn at all times when using a router.
- Only trained adults, or trained adolescents with supervision, should use the router.

== Moulding ==
The spindle router is positioned at the finer end of the scale of work done by a molding spindle. That is to say it is able to cut grooves, edge molding, and chamfer or radius the edge of a piece of wood. It is also possible to use it for cutting some joints. The shape of cut that is created is determined by the size and shape of the bit (cutter) held in the collet and the depth by the depth adjustment of the sole plate.

== Variety of routers ==
There are a variety of router styles, some are plunge, some are D handled, some are double knob handled. Different manufacturers produce the routers for different wood works, as plunge routers, fixed-base wood routers, combo routers, variable-speed routers, laminate trimmers, CNC wood routers. Nowadays, most better quality routers have variable speed controls and will have plunge bases that can also be locked in place so the router can be used as a fixed-base router. Some have a soft-start feature, meaning they build up speed gradually. This feature is particularly desirable for routers with a large cutter. Holding a 3-horsepower router and turning it on without a soft-start is potentially dangerous, due to the torque of the motor. Holding it with two hands is a must. For routers with a toggle type on/off switch it is important to check to verify the switch is in the off position, prior to plugging it in. For safety, larger router cutters can usually only be used in a router that is mounted in a router table. This makes the tool even more versatile and stable.

The purpose of multiple handle arrangements depends on the bit. Control is easier with different configurations. For example, when shaping the edge of a fine table top, many users prefer a D handle, with variable speed, as it seems to permit better control and burning the wood can be minimized.

Routers have many uses. With the help of jigs and various bits, they are capable of producing dovetails, mortises, tenons, moldings, dados, rabbets/rebates, raised-panel doors and frames, and cutting circles.

== Features of the modern spindle router ==
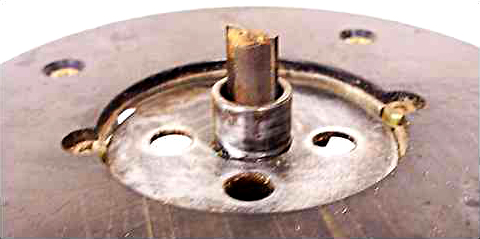
Template guide bushing secured in the base around the router cutter

The tool usually consists of a base housing a vertically mounted universal electric motor with a collet on the end of its shaft. The bit is height-adjustable to allow protrusion through an opening in a flat sole plate, usually via adjusting the motor-mounting height (the mechanism of adjustment is widely varied among manufacturers). Control of the router is derived from a handle or knob on each side of the device, or by the more recently developed "D-handle".

There are two standard types of router—plunge and fixed. When using a plunge-base router, the sole of the base is placed on the face of the work with the cutting bit raised above the work, then the motor is turned on and the cutter is lowered into the work. With a fixed-base router, the cut depth is set before the tool is turned on. The sole plate is then either rested flat on the workpiece overhanging the edge so that the cutting bit is not contacting the work (and then entering the work from the side once the motor is turned on), or the sole plate is placed at an angle with the bit above the work and the bit is "rocked" over into the work once the motor is turned on. In each case, the bit cuts its way in, but the plunge router does it in a more refined way, although the bit used must be shaped so it bores into the wood when lowered.

The baseplate (sole plate) is generally circular (though this, too, varies by individual models) and may be used in conjunction with a fence attached to the base, which then braces the router against the edge of the work, or via a straight-edge clamped across the work to obtain a straight cut. Other means of guiding the machine include the template guide bushing secured in the base around the router cutter, or router cutters with built-in guide bearings. Both of these run against a straight edge or shaped template. Without this, the varying reaction of the wood against the torque of the tool makes it impossible to control with the precision normally required.

== Table mounted router ==
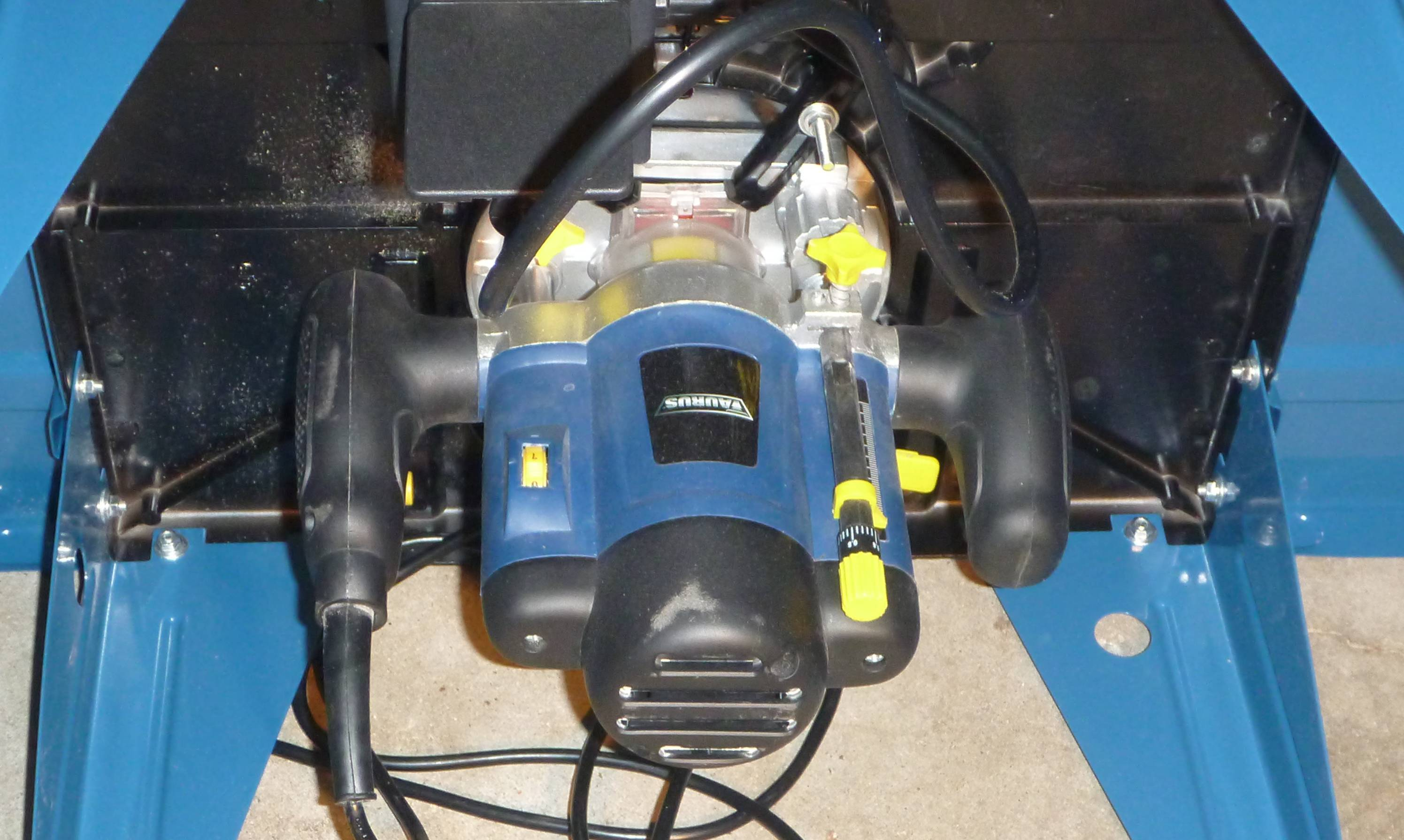
View underneath a router table showing plunge router attached.

A router may be mounted upside down in a router table or bench. The router's base plate is mounted to the underside of the table, with a hole allowing the bit to protrude above the table top. This allows the work to be passed over the router, rather than passing the router over the work. This has benefits when working with smaller objects and makes some router operations safer to execute. A router table may be fitted with a fence, fingerboards and other work-guiding accessories to make the operation safer and more accurate.

A simple router table consists of a rigid top with the router bolted or screwed directly to the underside. More complex solutions can be developed to allow the router to be easily removed from the table as well as facilitate adjusting the router's bit height using a lift mechanism; there is a wide range of commercially available systems.

In this mode, the router can perform tasks similar to a spindle moulder. For smaller, lighter jobs, the router used in this way can be more convenient than the spindle moulder, with the task of set up being somewhat faster. There is also a much wider range of bit profiles available for the router, although the size is limited.

The router table is usually oriented so that the router bit is vertical and the table over which the work is passed is horizontal. Variations on this include the horizontal router table, in which the table remains horizontal but the router is mounted vertically above the table, so that the router bit cuts from the side. This alternative is for edge operations, such as panel raising and slot cutting.

== Available cutters ==
Profiles made in wood by several common router bits.

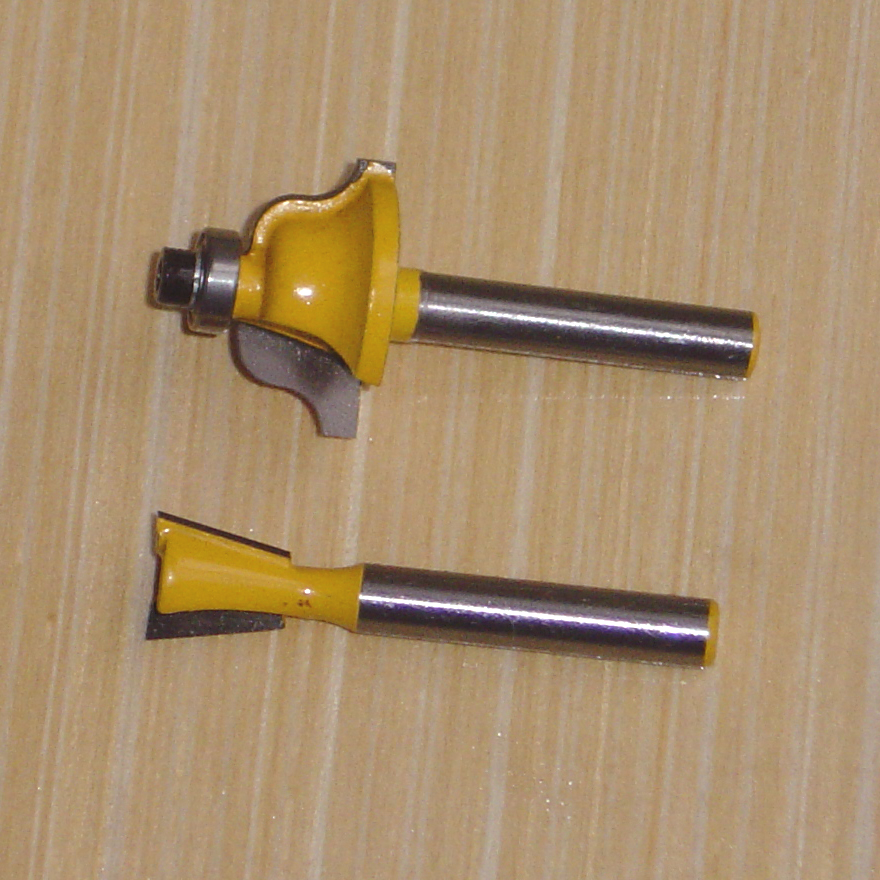
Two typical router bits: (top) a 1/4-inch shaft Roman Ogee with bearing, (bottom) 1/4-inch shaft dovetail bit.

Router bits come in a large variety of designs to create either decorative effects or joinery aids. Generally, they are classified as either high-speed steel (HSS) or carbide-tipped, however some recent innovations such as solid carbide bits provide even more variety for specialized tasks.

Aside from the materials they are made of, bits can be classified as edge bits or non-edge bits, and whether the bit is designed to be anti-kickback. Edge bits have a small wheel bearing to act as a fence against the work in making edge moldings. These bearings can be changed by using commercially available bearing kits. Changing the bearing, in effect, changes the diameter of the cutting edge. This is especially important with rabbeting/rebating bits. Non-edge bits require the use of a fence, either on a router table or attached to the work or router. Anti-kickback bits employ added non-cutting bit material around the circumference of the bit's shoulders which serves to limit feed-rate. This reduces the chance that the workpiece is pushed too deeply into the bit (which would result in significant kickback from the cutting edge being unable to compensate).

Bits also differ by the diameter of their shank, with 1/2-inch, 12 mm, 10 mm, 3/8-inch, 8 mm and 1/4-inch and 6 mm shanks (ordered from thickest to thinnest) being the most common. Half-inch bits cost more but, being stiffer, are less prone to vibration (giving smoother cuts) and are less likely to break than the smaller sizes. Care must be taken to ensure the bit shank and router collet sizes match exactly. Failure to do so can cause permanent damage to either or both and can lead to the dangerous situation of the bit coming out of the collet during operation. Many routers come with removable collets for the popular shank sizes (in the US 1/2 in and 1/4 in, in Great Britain 1/2 in, 8 mm and 1/4 in, and metric sizes in Europe—although in the United States the 3/8 in and 8 mm sizes are often only available for an extra cost).

Many modern routers allow the speed of the bit's rotation to be varied. A slower rotation allows bits of larger cutting diameter to be used safely. Typical speeds range from 8,000 to 30,000 rpm.

Router bits can be made to match almost any imaginable profile. Custom router bits can be ordered. They are especially beneficial for home restoration projects, where production of the original trim and molding has been discontinued.

Sometimes complementary bits come in sets designed to facilitate the joinery used in frame and panel construction. One bit is designed to cut the grove in the rail and stile pieces while the other shapes the edge of the panel to fit in the grove.

== CNC router ==
A CNC wood router is a computer controlled machine to which the router or spindle mounts. The CNC Machine can be either a moving gantry style, where the table is fixed and the router spindle moves over it, or fixed bridge design, where the table moves underneath the router spindle, or hand-held style, where the operator moves the machine to the area to be cut and the machine controls the fine adjustments. CAD/CAM software programming is used to model the part that is to be created in the computer and then create a tool path for the machine to follow to cut out the part. The CNC moves along three axes (X-Y-Z). Most CNC routers have a three motor drive system utilizing either servo or stepper motors. More advanced routers use a four motor system for added speed and accuracy.

== Similar tools ==
A tool similar to a router, but designed to hold smaller cutting bits—thereby making it easier to handle for small jobs—is a laminate trimmer.

A related tool, called a spindle moulder (UK) or shaper (North America), is used to hold larger cutter heads and can be used for deeper or larger-diameter cuts. Another related machine is the pin router, a larger static version of the hand electric router but normally with a much more powerful motor and other features such as automatic template copying.

Some profile cutters use a cutting head reminiscent of a spindle router. These should not be confused with profile cutters used for steel plate which use a flame as the cutting method.

== See also ==
- Laminate trimmer
- Biscuit joiner
- End mill
- Drill bit

== Bibliography ==
- Broun, Jeremy (1989). The Incredible Router. Lewes, East Sussex: Guild of Master Craftsman Publications. ISBN 0-946819-17-3.
- Hylton, Bill; Matlack, Fred (1993). Woodworking with the Router. Pleasantville, New York: Reader's Digest Association. ISBN 0-7621-0227-6.
- Spielman, Patrick (1993). The New Router Handbook. New York: Sterling Publishing Co. Inc. ISBN 0-8069-0518-2.
- Todd, Robert H.; Allen, Dell K.; Alting, Leo (1994). Manufacturing Process Reference Guide. Industrial Press Inc., New York.
