= Wood shaper =

Stationary woodworking machine

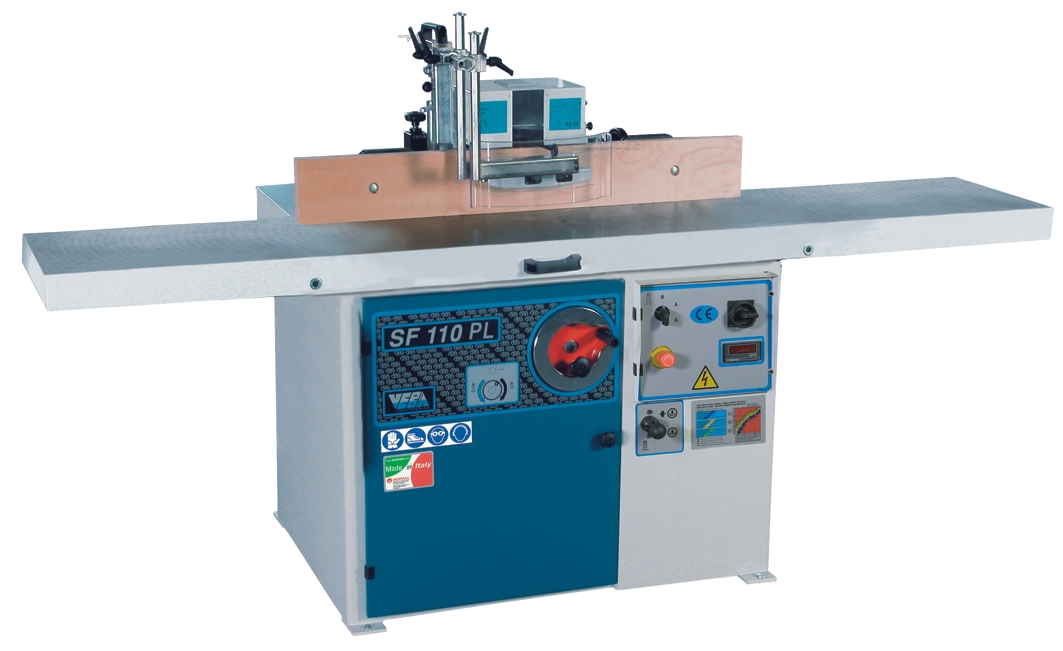
- Wood shaper, a single-axis tool
- Application: Woodworking

A wood shaper (usually just shaper in North America or spindle moulder in the UK and Europe), is a stationary woodworking machine in which a vertically oriented spindle drives one or more stacked cutter heads to mill profiles on wood stock.

== Description ==
Wood shaper cutter heads typically have three blades, and turn at one-half to one-eighth the speed of smaller, much less expensive two-bladed bits used on a hand-held wood router. Adapters are sold allowing a shaper to drive router bits, a compromise on several levels. As are router tables, cost-saving adaptations of hand-held routers mounted to comparatively light-duty dedicated work tables.

The wood being fed into a moulder is commonly referred to as either stock or blanks. The spindle may be raised and lowered relative to the shaper's table, and rotates between 3,000 and 10,000 rpm, with stock running along a vertical fence.

Being both larger and much more powerful than routers, shapers can cut much larger profiles than routers – such as for crown moulding and raised-panel doors – and readily drive custom-made bits fabricated with unique profiles. Shapers feature between 1.5 and 5 horsepower (1.1 and 3.7 kW) belt-driven motors, which run much more quietly and smoothly than typically 10,000 to 25,000 rpm direct-drive routers. Speed adjustments are typically made by relocating the belts on a stepped pulley system, much like that on a drill press. Unlike routers, shapers are also able to run in reverse, which is necessary in performing some cuts.

The most common form of wood shaper has a vertical spindle, some with tilting spindles or tables. There are combination machines, manufactured mostly by European and Asian companies which combine shapers with tables saws, joiners and other woodworking power tools in one machine.

Shapers can be adapted to perform specialized cuts employing accessories such as sliding tables, tenon tables, tilting arbor, tenoning hoods, and interchangeable spindles. The standard US spindle shaft is 1 3/4 in (44 mm), with 3/4 or 1/2 in (19 or 13 mm) on small shapers and 30 mm on European models. Most spindles are tall enough to accommodate more than one cutter head, allowing rapid tooling changes by raising or lowering desired heads into position. Additional spindles can be fitted with pre-spaced cutter heads when more are needed for a job than fit on one.

A wood moulder (American English) is similar to a shaper, but is a more powerful and complex machine with multiple cutting heads at both 90-degrees and parallel to its table. A wood shaper has only a single cutting head, mounted on a perpendicular axis to its table.

== Safety ==
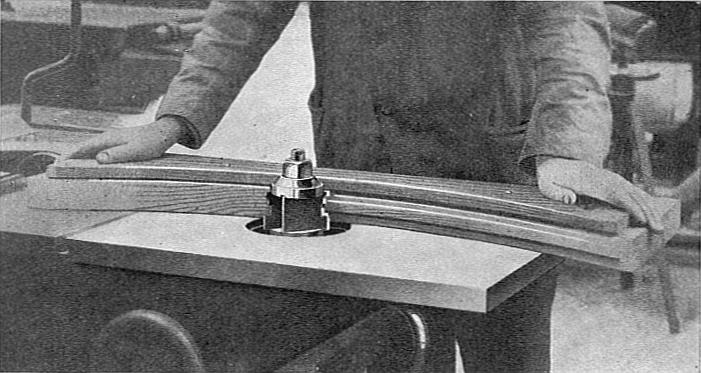
A wood shaper used in 1925 with obsolete and hazardous flat-sided tooling, and no safety equipment.

The primary safety feature on a wood shaper is a guard mounted above the cutter protecting hands and garments from being drawn into its blades. Jigs, fixtures such as hold-downs, and accessories that include featherboards, also help prevent injury and generally result in better cuts. The starter, or fulcrum, pin is a metal rod which threads into the table a few inches away from the cutter allowing stock to be fed into it in a freehand cut.

In addition to aiding productivity and setting a consistent rate of milling, a power feeder keeps appendages and garments out of harm's way. It may be multi-speed, and employ rubber wheels to feed stock past the cutter head.

== Types ==
Single head moulder (a "shaper" in the US):

- Have a top (horizontal) head only.
- Cost less to buy, and are less complex and easier to both set up and run.

Multi Head Moulder (a "moulder" in the US):

- Has multiple cutting heads.
- Can process more work on complex jobs than a single head tool, in a single pass.
- May have (in its standard form) up to four cutting heads, two parallel to the table and two perpendicular to it.

An alternative configuration has two bottom and two top heads, in order to size the lumber with the first top and the first bottom head, and then shape the lumber with the remaining top and bottom heads. Machines with two or more right heads are more common in the furniture industry to give the ability to run shorter stock and deeper more detailed cuts on the edge of the stock.

== Tooling ==
Tooling refers to cutters, knives, blades, as well as planer blades, and cutter heads. Most blades are made from either a tool steel alloy known as high speed steel (HSS), or from carbide steel. Cutter heads are normally made from either steel or aluminum. High Speed Steel, carbide, aluminium, and steel for the cutter heads all come in a wide variety of grades.

== Bibliography ==
- "Wood Shapers - Information and resources about wood shapers, particularly older models". Old Wood Working Machines (OWWM).
- Welcome to the Architectural Woodwork Institute
