= Japanese chisel =

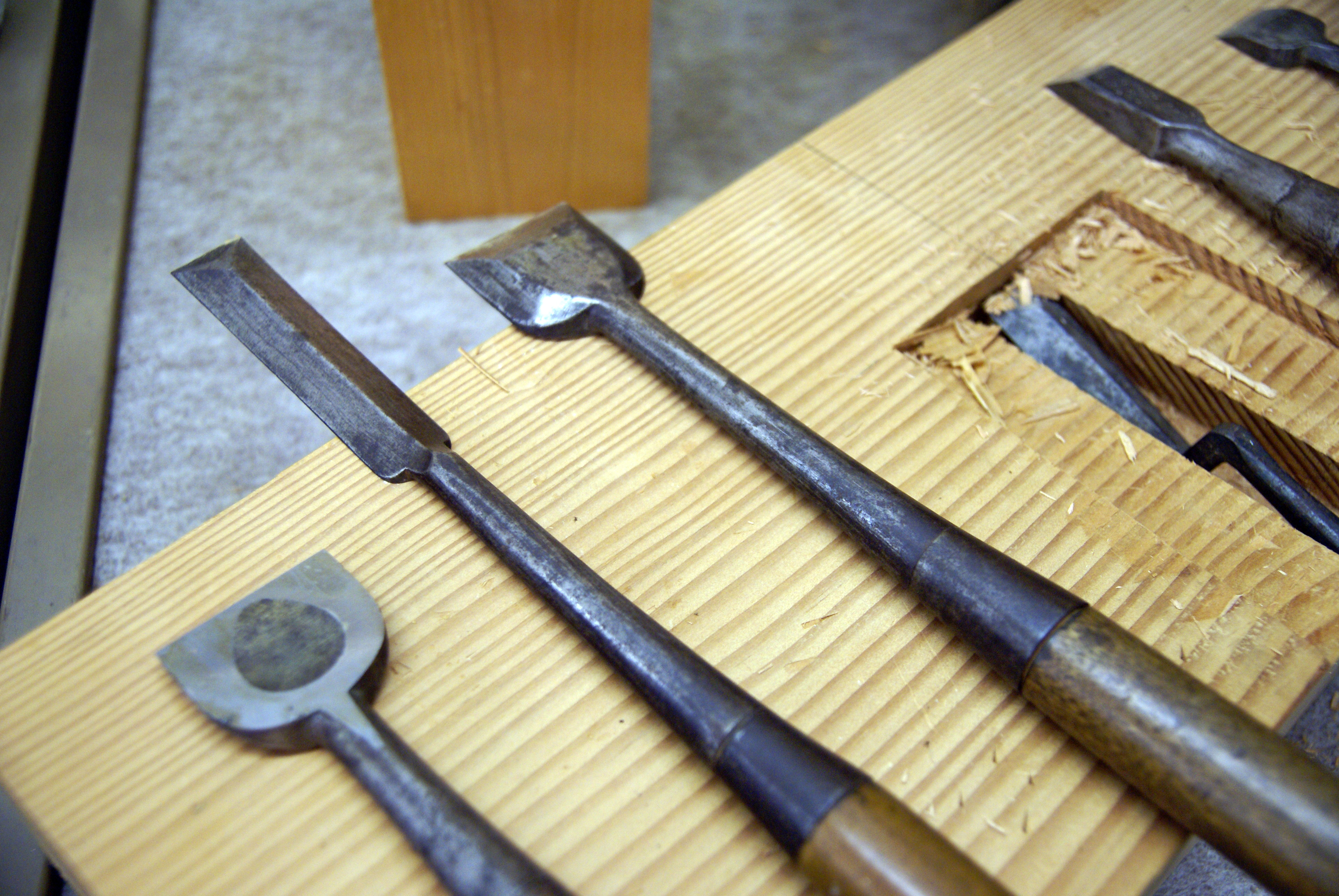
Japanese chisels

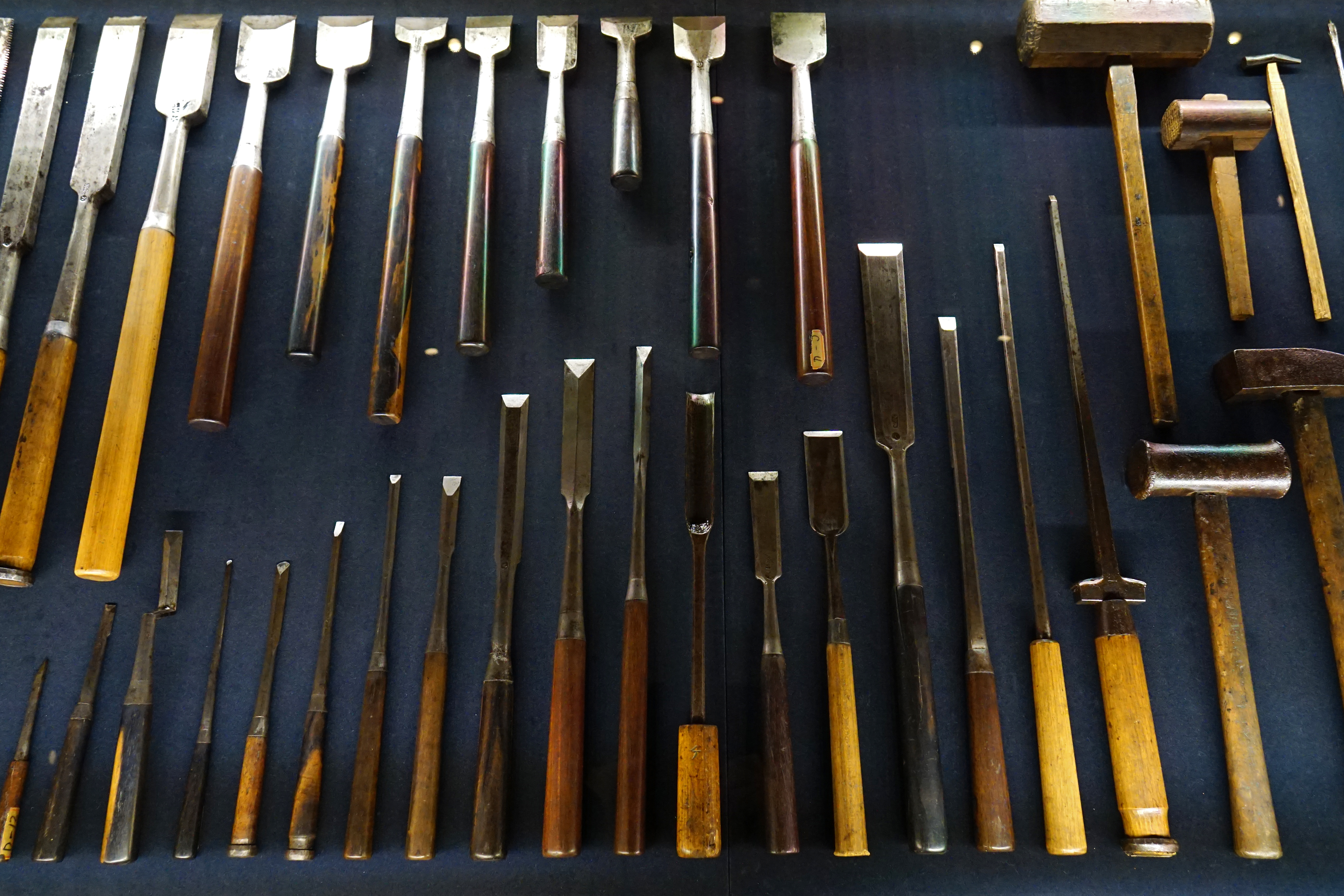
More Japanese chisels

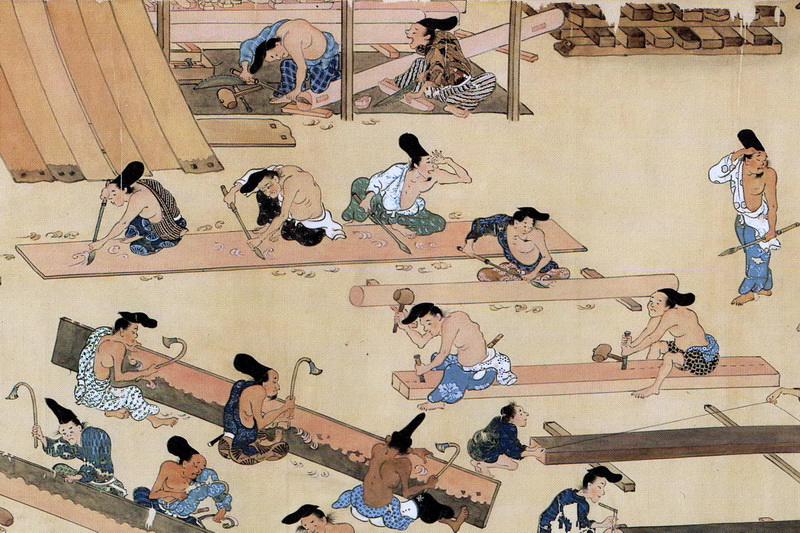
Japanese chisels in use, among other tools (early 14th Century)

The Japanese chisel or nomi (鑿, のみ) is made on similar principles to the Japanese plane. There is a hard blade, called hagane attached to a softer piece of metal called the jigane.

== Types ==
- The oire nomi (追入れ鑿) is the most usual type of Japanese chisel. The name literally means rabbeting chisel.
- The shinogi nomi (鎬鑿) has beveled edges for making dovetail joints.

== Preparation ==
A Japanese chisel usually requires some set-up, called shikomi (仕込み). The metal ring attached to the handle must be removed, the wood and ring filed to match, the ring replaced on the chisel and then the wood beaten down around the ring so that the mallet strikes the wood. The function of the metal ring is to prevent the wooden handle from splitting. The handles are often made of Red or White Oak.

== Sharpening ==
Japanese carpenters use waterstones for sharpening.

== See also ==
- Japanese carpentry
