= Kiridashi =

Kiridashi may refer to:

- Kiridashi (knife), a Japanese knife
- Kiridashi (horse), a Canadian Thoroughbred racehorse
