= Japanese Homes and Their Surroundings =

1886 book by Edward S. Morse

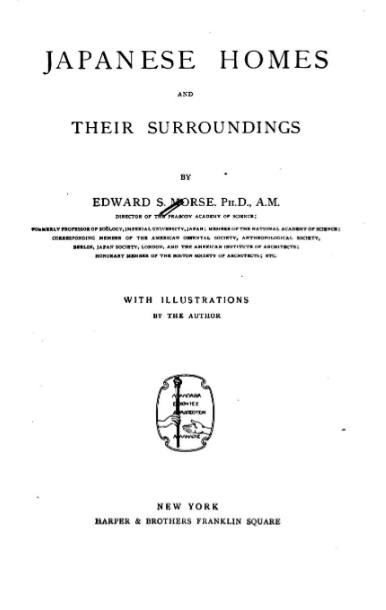
- Title page for Japanese Homes and Their Surroundings (1885)
- Author: Edward S. Morse
- Publisher: Charles E. Tuttle Company
- Publication date: 1886
- ISBN: 0-8048-0998-4

Japanese Homes and their Surroundings is a book by Edward S. Morse describing and illustrating the construction of Japanese homes. It was first published in 1886 after its author had spent three years in Japan studying and teaching zoology. It contains numerous drawings by Morse of various features of Japanese houses, including details of construction, a description of carpenter's tools, and a section on bonsai and flower arrangement.

== See also ==
- Edward S. Morse
