= Japanese carpentry =

Distinctive woodworking style

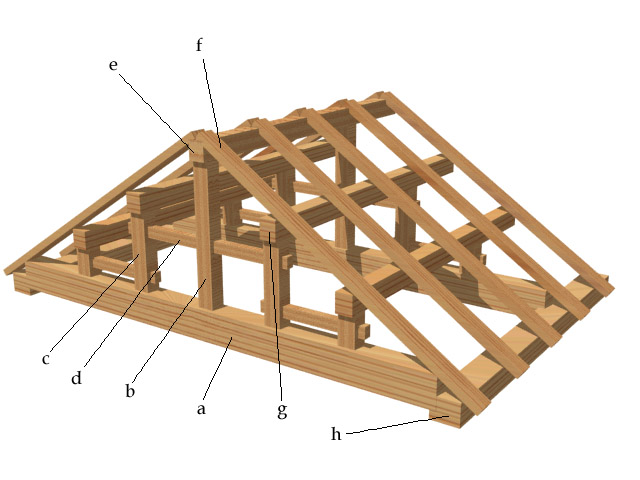
Wagoya type traditional roof framing, a post-and-lintel type of framing

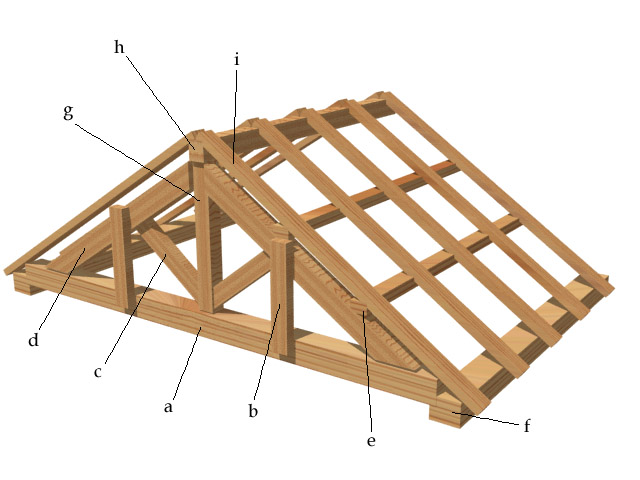
Yogoya type traditional roof framing, called western style

Japanese carpentry was first developed in the 12th century. It was influenced by Chinese architectural styles but its techniques have evolved independently due to differences in earthquakes and climate. It is characterized by the use of wooden joints and almost no nails. It has been involved in the construction of a wide variety of structures, such as temples, dwellings, and tea houses, as well as furniture.

The style of Japanese carpentry and its prominent use of wood was developed in part from the constraints of the hot and humid Japanese climate. For example, traditional houses are raised to let air move beneath and around them.

== Schools of carpentry ==
Though there is a core practice shared by all Japanese carpenters, defined by a vocabulary of tools and joints and a method of working, a carpenter will typically identify with one of four distinct carpentry professions. Miyadaiku (宮大工) practice the construction of Japanese shrines and temples, and are renowned for their use of elaborate wooden joints and the fact that the buildings they construct are frequently found among the world's longest surviving wooden structures. Teahouse and residential carpenters, known as sukiya-daiku (数寄屋大工), are famed for their delicate aesthetic constructions using natural materials and carefully scribed joinery. Furniture makers are known as sashimono-shi (指し物師), and interior finishing carpenters, who build shōji (障子) and ranma (欄間), are termed tateguya (建具屋).

Though it is rare to find a sashimono-shi or tateguya practising outside of their field, it is not uncommon for a carpentry workshop to work simultaneously as both miyadaiku and sukiyadaiku.

== Tools ==
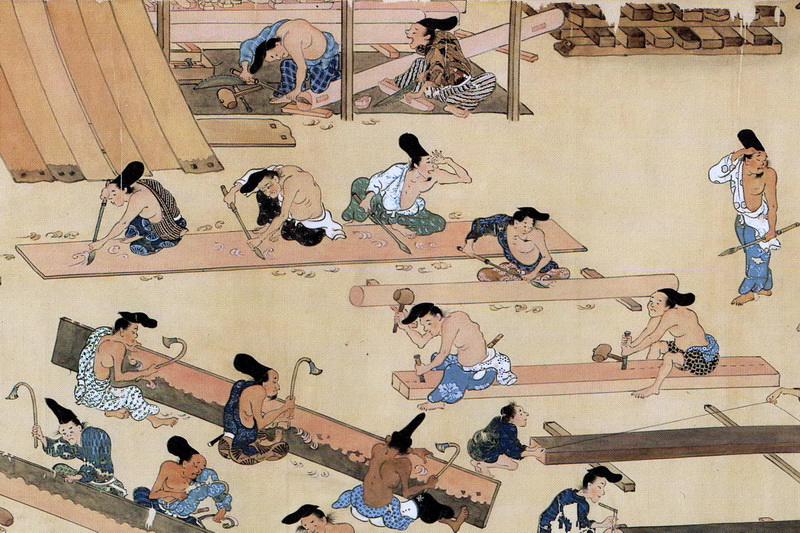
Using saws, adzes, chisels, yariganna (planes) and sumitsubo (inkpots) in a construction site

The tools commonly used by Japanese carpenters are divided into a few basic families, within which there are found a multitude of variations and specializations geared toward particular tasks:

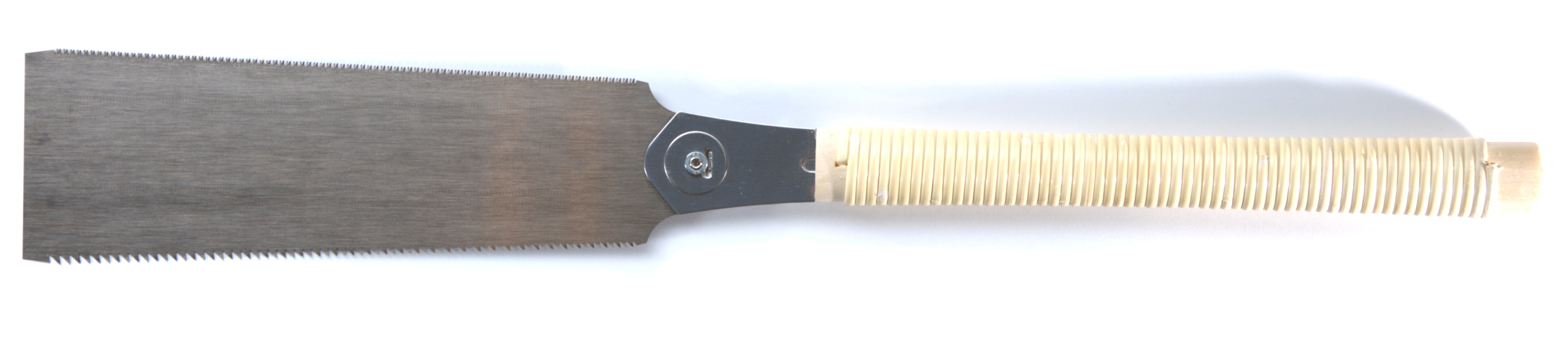
Ryoba

- Japanese saw (鋸, nokogiri), which cuts on the pull stroke, rather than the otherwise globally prevalent push stroke. This allows the blades to be quite thin in comparison to the Western saw. There are two main kinds of cutting teeth on Japanese saws: crosscut (横挽き, yokobiki) and rip (縦挽き, tatebiki). The rip and crosscut are combined in one blade, known as a ryoba (両刃; lit. 'dual edge'). The rip and crosscut patterns are also made in single-edged saws, kataba nokogiri (片刃), both with stiffening back pieces and without. The stiff-backed saws, known as douzuki (胴付き; lit. 'attached trunk') are typically used in cutting fine joinery. There are many other types of Japanese saws as well: osae-biki (押さえ引き鋸; lit. 'press-cut saw'), used for flush-cutting pegs to a surface without marring the surface. The saw teeth have no set to one or both sides to accomplish this feat. There is the azebiki (畔挽き; lit. 'ridge saw'), which has cutting both rip and crosscut teeth, and is short and rounded in profile. It is used for sawing in confined areas and starting cuts in the middle of surfaces. There are many other types and sub-types of saw. Most saws sold in the West are mass-produced items with induction-hardened teeth and relatively cheap replaceable blades. The handmade forged saws are very laborious to make and involve more manufacturing steps in the forging to complete than planes or chisels.

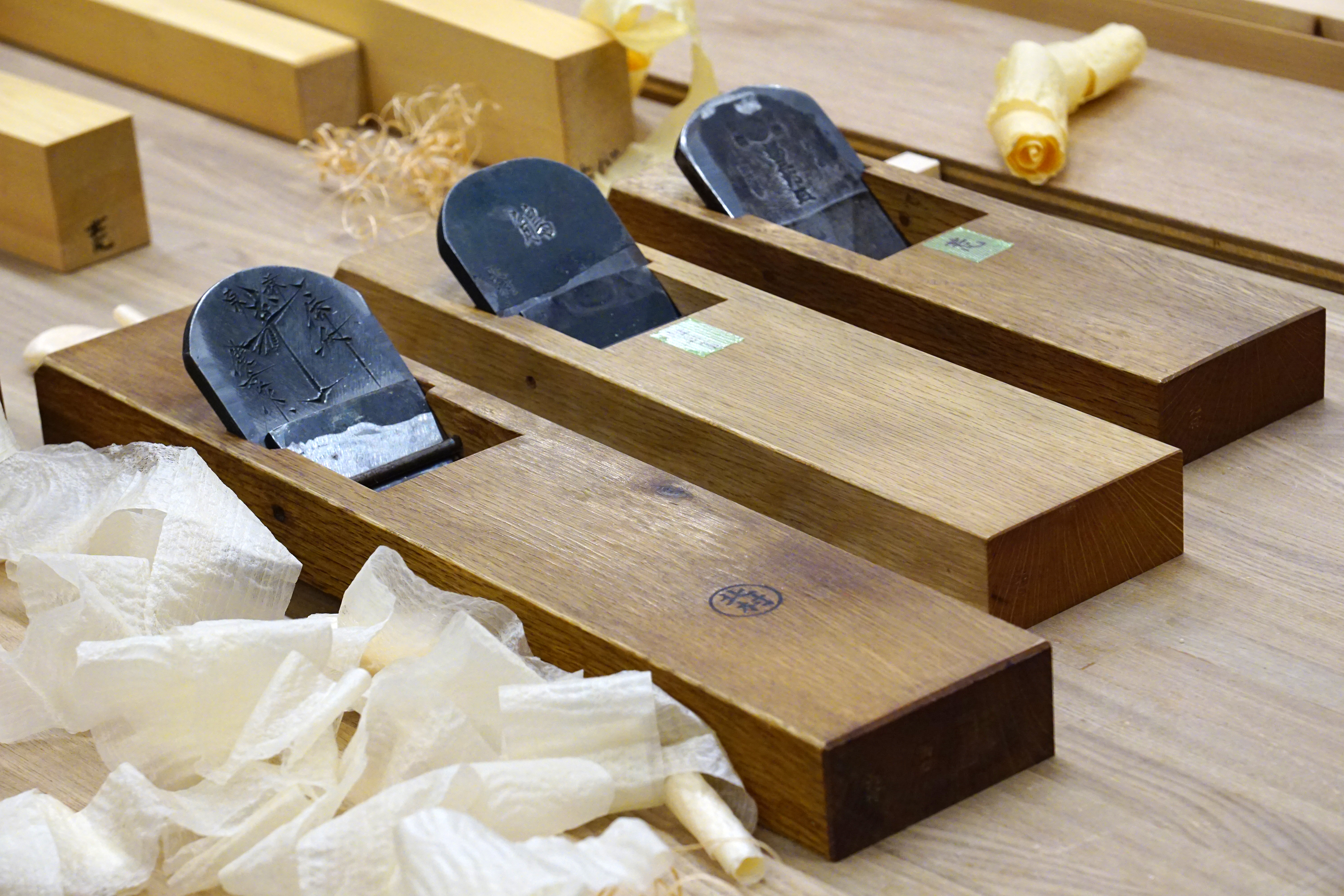
Kanna

- Japanese plane (鉋, kanna), is most commonly a wooden block, or dai (台) containing a laminated blade, sub-blade, and securing pin. In the Japanese plane, the blade is fixed in position primarily by the plane's abutments that are cut in the sides of the dai. This is similar to a still manufactured type of European wooden plane, in which the blade is fixed in place by tapping down upon a wooden wedge. Unlike a western plane, the support bed for the blade is not a flat surface in a Japanese plane - rather it is convex. The blade itself is tapered in thickness so as to wedge tightly into the dai when tapped down into place. The blade is also tapered in width to allow its projection to be adjusted by tapping it from side to side, so that a uniform shaving thickness can be attained. Japanese planes are generally operated by pulling rather than pushing, and work can be done in the seated position or using the whole body for more power.
  - Considered part of the kanna family, the yarigana is an archaic type of Japanese plane resembling a spear. The yarigana is a single piece of steel with one end being used as a handle and the other forged into a leaf shaped blade. The carpenter holds the yarigana with two hands, perpendicular to his arms, and pulls towards his body producing a concave gouge in the timber. The yarigana was in universal use prior to the introduction of the block-mounted wood plane to Japan, and is today typically reserved for use on large circular columns or in cases where a more rustic appearance is desired in the final element.

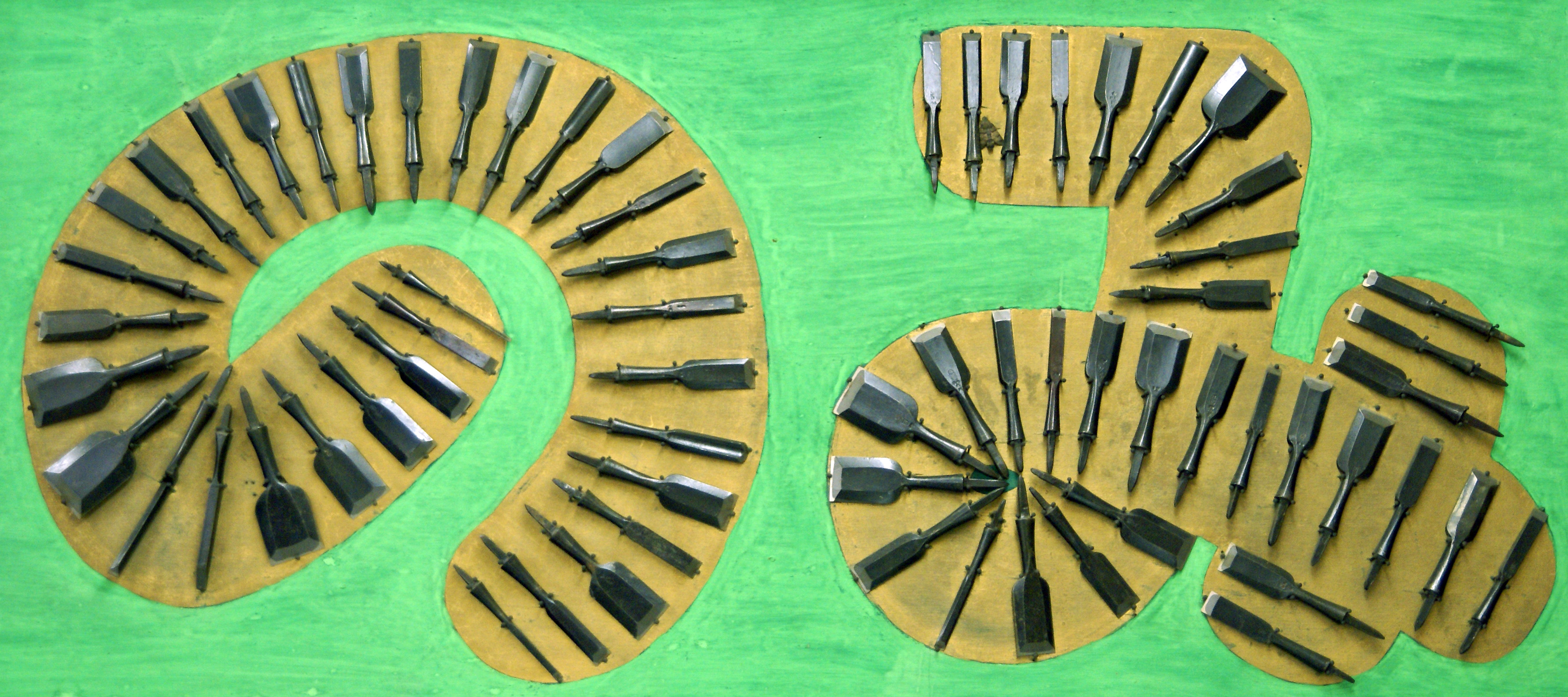
Chisels

- Japanese chisel (鑿, nomi). There are bench chisels, paring chisels, striking chisels, heavy timber chisels and slicks, and myriad others for specialized applications. Like the planes, the blades are of laminated hard steel/soft steel construction. Bevel angle varies from 20˚ to 35˚ typically, with mortising and heavy chisels featuring steep angles, and paring chisels having shallower angles. It is common in Japan to work with softwoods, so many chisels are made with that in mind, and require the bevels be steepened if employed for harder woods.
- Japanese gimlet (錐, kiri). The kiri is used for boring circular holes in a timber, often as the first stage in the hollowing out of a mortise. Though seemingly simple to use, the kiri is commonly considered one of the most difficult tools to master.

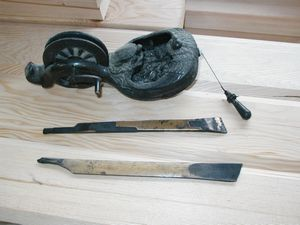
Sumitsubo (and sumi-sashi, wooden brushes)

- Inkpot (墨壺, sumitsubo). The sumitsubo is used for marking long straight lines onto various surfaces. A thread (tsuboito) is tied to a rounded piece of wood with a needle fixed at the end (karuko). The other end of the thread is passed through the small opening at the end of the sumitsubo (itoguchi), through the depression containing ink (ike) and wound around a spool (itomaki-guruma). The ink is stored in the ike soaked in silk wadding. Silk threads are used as tsuboito. To draw a line, the sumitsubo is held in the left hand and the karuko's needle is fixed onto the surface determining the position of one end of the thread. The sumitsubo is gradually moved away from the karuko until the required length of the thread is unreeled at which point the rotation of the spool is stopped using the thumb. With the index finger the thread is pressed down at the required end point of the line. Using the right hand, the thread is pulled upwards into tension and then suddenly released, consequently hitting the surface and leaving a straight line of ink onto any surface, regardless of any surface irregularities.
- Japanese axe (ono (斧)) and adze (chōna (釿)). Specifically, the masakari ((鉞))or habiro ((刃広))are used for processing a timbered log into relative flat either for further processing or use.
- Japanese hammer (玄能; Genno or Gennoh). There are several types of carpentry hammers. Some hammers are used for chisel work, some for positioning hand plane blades, some for hammering and pulling nails, and others for tapping out laminated hardened steel from base of plane blades and chisels.
- Tools for measuring and marking include the bamboo pen (墨さし, Sumisashi), carpenter's square (差し金, Sashigane), marking knife (切り出し, Kiridashi), the traditional single and multi-blade marking gauges (罫引; Kebiki and Kinshiro), among others. Measuring tools are commonly marked in centimeters and millimeters. For traditional work, squares marked in customary units sun (寸) (1/330 m = 3.03 cm) and bu (分) (1/1/3300 m = 3.03 mm) are available.

=== Blades ===
Though a carpenter will typically fashion handles and woodblocks and set and sharpen their blades themselves, the blades themselves are forged by steel smiths and provided unmounted to the carpenter. Japanese steel has long enjoyed a high level of refinement, without which the fine surfaces and detail for which Japanese woodwork is renowned would not be possible. The blades used in the Japanese chisel and the Japanese plane share similar constructive principles to the Japanese sword. A thin piece of extremely hard blade metal called ha-gane (鋼; lit. 'edge metal') is forge-welded to a softer piece of metal called ji-gane (地金; lit. 'base metal'). The function of the softer base metal is to absorb shock, and to protect the more brittle ha-gane from breaking. This technology allows for the use of steels in the hagane which are harder than in use in Western chisels, typically Rockwell 62 and up, and also allows for the honing of a much finer edge than is typically known in carpentry outside Japan. When sharpening a blade, a Japanese carpenter will typically use three or more whetstones of varying coarseness, progressing from the roughest stone to the finest.

The blades of both planes and chisels are distinguished by the hollow, ura in their flat side. This hollow portion has a number of functions. The primary function is that it ensures a high degree of flatness when sharpening, in that when the flat side is polished it cannot rock or develop a curve because it is only contacting the stone on either side of its width. This then improves the precision with which cuts can be made by the chisel, and in the case of planes ensures smooth contact with the wedge and therefore even support across the full width of its blade. The hollow also greatly reduces the amount of metal needed to be removed to achieve flatness on the back of the blade, which shortens initial set-up and subsequent re-sharpening considerably. Secondly, in the case of chisels, it reduces the frictional resistance as the chisel is driven into or extracted from the wood. Thirdly, the interaction of the leading edge of the hollow with the edge of the blade is a changing relationship as the tool is re-sharpened. With plane blades, as the edge is sharpened down to the rim of the hollow, the edge can then be 'tapped-out' (ura-dashi), a process where a pointed hammer is used to depress the ha-gane downward slightly along the bevel of the blade. When the blade's back is re-flattened after ura-dashi, the hollow is re-established; thus the hollow acts as a sort of gauge for sharpening as a means of prolonging the life of the thin piece of cutting steel as long as possible. This in turn tends to keep the geometry of the blade consistent over time, which keeps it fitting the dai over time.

There are many types of steel used for the ha-gane of Japanese planes and chisels:

- White paper steel, shiro-gami; a nearly pure steel that takes a very keen edge and resharpens easily. There are several types of white steel, #1 and #2 being the most common.
- Blue paper steel, ao-gami; a steel with alloyed elements such as molybdenum to enhance the durability of the edge. This steel is a little more difficult to sharpen than the white, and does not take quite as keen an edge, but is more durable in use. The common blue steels used are #1, #2, and "Super-Blue"
  →The paper steels are produced by Hitachi, and refer to the color of the paper wrapping the stock after production.
- Tama-hagane; this steel derives from the smelting of a special iron-rich river sand and is normally reserved for use in sword-making, however some does find use in saws, chisels and planes.
- Togo-Reigo: this steel was produced by the Andrews Company of Sheffield England in the 1920s and some found its way to Japan where it has been used for making plane blades
- Swedish Steel

=== Vise ===
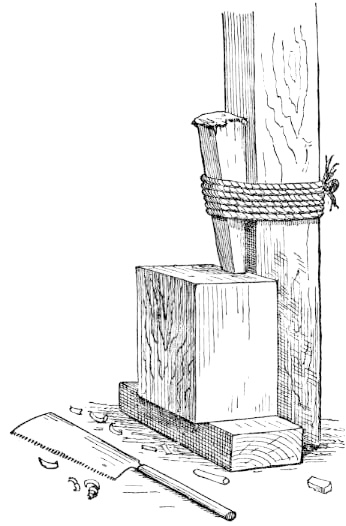
A traditional Japanese vise from Japanese Homes and Their Surroundings by Edward S. Morse

The traditional Japanese vise was a wedge of wood tied to a post with a coil of rope. The wood was inserted under the wedge and the wedge hammered down.

Vises of any sort are used far less in traditional Japanese carpentry than would be the case for equivalent tasks in the traditional crafts of the West. Many tasks in Japanese carpentry associated with building, involve very large pieces of timber, and in general, the weight of the timber and of the carpenter are used to stabilize the piece on which the carpenter is working. For this reason the carpenter's horses used in Japan are much lower than their Western counterparts, and carpenters must always position themselves over their work. Much of the work on smaller pieces of material can be done in the seated position, and relies on the fact that the saws and planes both cut on the pull stroke, enabling stabilization of the work using the body or shooting board.

== Lumber ==
Woods used in Japanese carpentry and woodwork, as well as tool construction, include sugi (杉), akamatsu (赤松), hinoki (檜 or 桧), camphor laurel, Magnolia obovata, keyaki (欅) and kiri (桐).

== See also ==
- Japanese architecture
- Japanese handicrafts
- Housing in Japan discusses traditional and modern houses and their building materials
- Tansu (Japanese cabinetry and mobile cabinets)
- Yakisugi
- Yosegi (Japanese parquetry)
- 梁 (建築) Beams in architecture (Japanese language site)
