= Japanese plane =

Wood shaping tool

A Japanese plane in use

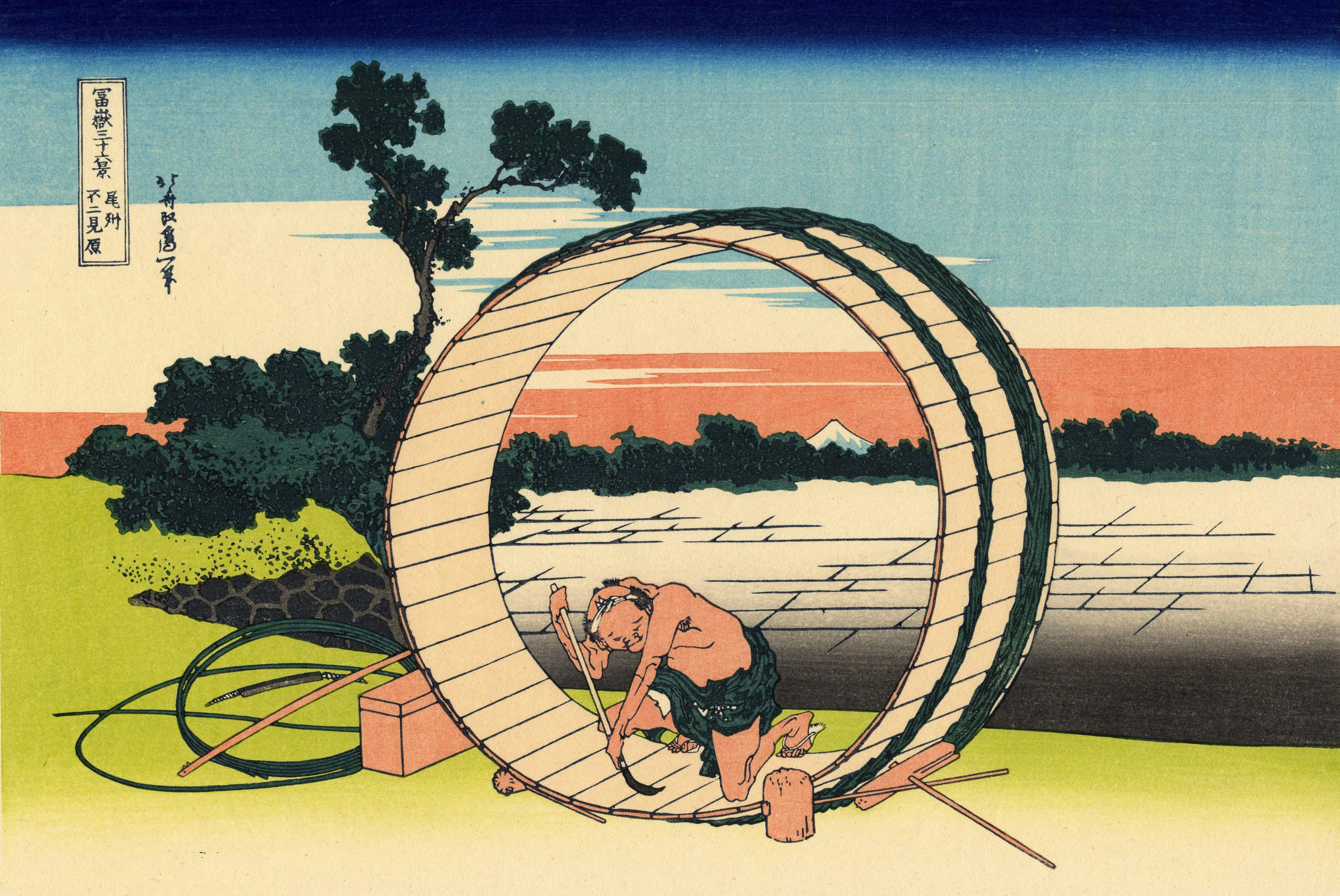
A Japanese cooper using a yariganna or spear-plane

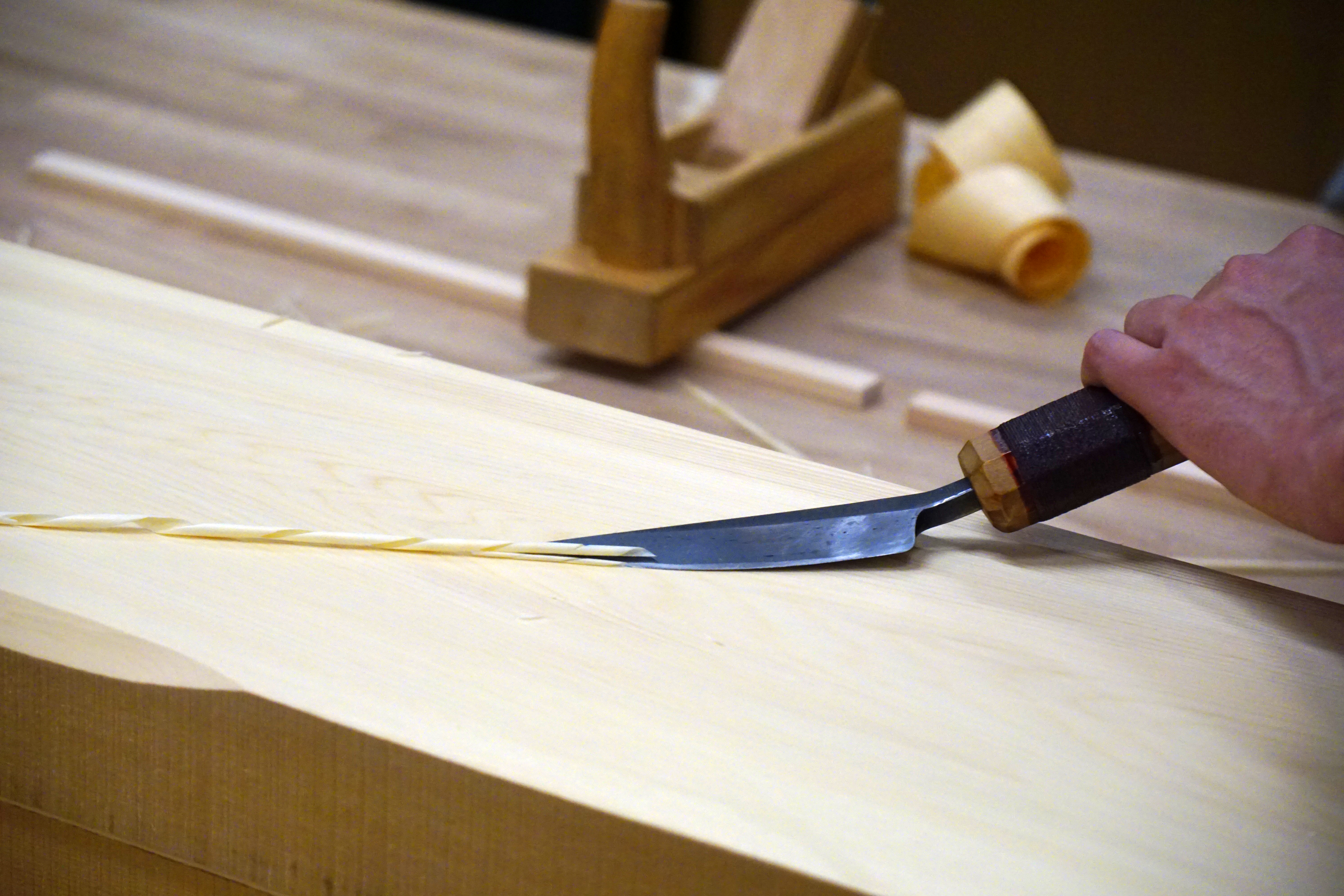
A yariganna or spear-plane in the Takenaka Carpentry Tools Museum, Kobe

The Japanese plane or kanna (鉋) is a plane pulled towards the user rather than pushed in the manner of western style planes. They are made of hardwood, usually Japanese white or red oak. The laminated steel and iron blade is stout compared to western planes. Tapered in length and thickness, the plane blade is its own wedge, as it fits into a correspondingly-shaped mortice in the body of the plane, thus dispensing the need for a separate wedge to hold the blade in place, as is the case in most other traditional wooden planes. The chip breaker is held in place with a simple nail inserted some distance away from and perpendicular to the axis of the main blade. The chip breaker is not tapered like the main blade; instead, it has bent "ears" that bear down on the plane blade. Chip breakers in Japan were introduced relatively recently, during the Meiji period. The soles of Japanese planes also have different configurations for varying applications. The apparently simple design disguises a great deal of complexity.

== Types ==
- Hira ganna (平鉋) is the usual type of flat plane used for smoothing wood. There are several types, depending on the level of finish.
  - Ara shikō ganna (荒仕工鉋) is used for the first planing.
  - Chū shikō ganna (中仕工鉋).
  - Jō shikō ganna (上仕工鉋).
  - Shiage ganna (仕上げ鉋) is used for finishing work.
- Kiwa ganna (際鉋) is a shoulder plane. The blade is angled and inserted into the centre of the plane block at an angle.
- Mizo ganna (溝鉋) is a groove plane used for cutting kamoi and shikii (see fusuma).
- Sori kanna (反り鉋) is a plane with a convex base used for scooping out curved surfaces.
- Dainaoshi ganna (台直し鉋) is used to plane the surface of other planes. Its blade is held at 90 degrees to its base.
- Yari ganna (槍鉋) is a spear-like plane, the original plane used in the most ancient buildings. Its use has been revived in Japanese temple carpentry.
- Nankin kanna (南京鉋) is a spokeshave with two handles.
- Tsuki kanna (突き鉋) is a push style kanna. These planes existed historically in Japan.

The name changes from kanna to ganna are due to rendaku.

== See also ==
- Japanese carpentry
